= List of strains of Escherichia coli =

== Strains ==
Innocuous:

- K-12 is from a stool sample and does not seem to be pathogenic.

Laboratory:

- E. coli K-12, one of two main laboratory strains (innocuous)
  - Clifton's original K-12 and the true "wild type", which is F+ λ+ O16. Still available as ATCC 10798.
  - MG1655 "wild type", F- λ-
    - DH1
      - DH5α
        - DH10b
  - W3110 "wild type", F- λ-
  - Dam dcm strain
- E. coli B, the other of the two main lab strains from which all lab substrains originate
  - E. coli REL606
  - E. coli BL21
    - E. coli BL21(DE3)
    - E. coli BL21-AI
- HB101, a hybrid between B and K-12 through recombination

Pathogenic:

- Escherichia coli NC101, a single isolate that acts as an AIEC (see below) in mice with serotype O2:H6/41

== Groups of strains ==
Pathogenic:

- Enterotoxigenic E. coli (ETEC)
- Enteropathogenic E. coli (EPEC)
- Enteroinvasive E. coli (EIEC)
- Shigatoxigenic and verotoxigenic Escherichia coli (STEC/VTEC), which includes:
  - Enterohemorrhagic E. coli
    - Hemolytic uremic syndrome–associated enterohemorrhagic E. coli (HUSEC)
  - E. coli O157:H7 (a group of several strains, albeit natural O157:H7 do share a common ancestor)
    - 2006 North American E. coli outbreak
  - Escherichia coli O121
  - And technically: Shigella
    - Shigella flexneri
    - Shigella dysenteriae
    - Shigella boydii
    - Shigella sonnei
- Enteroaggregative E. coli (EAEC)
  - E. coli O104:H4
    - 2011 E. coli O104:H4 outbreak
  - Escherichia coli O104:H21
- Uropathogenic E. coli (UPEC)
- Escherichia coli K1 (a serogroup), meningitis
- Adherent-invasive Escherichia coli (AIEC), morbus Crohn

== See also ==
- Escherichia coli BL21(DE3)
