= Pathogenic Escherichia coli =

Strains of E. coli that can cause disease

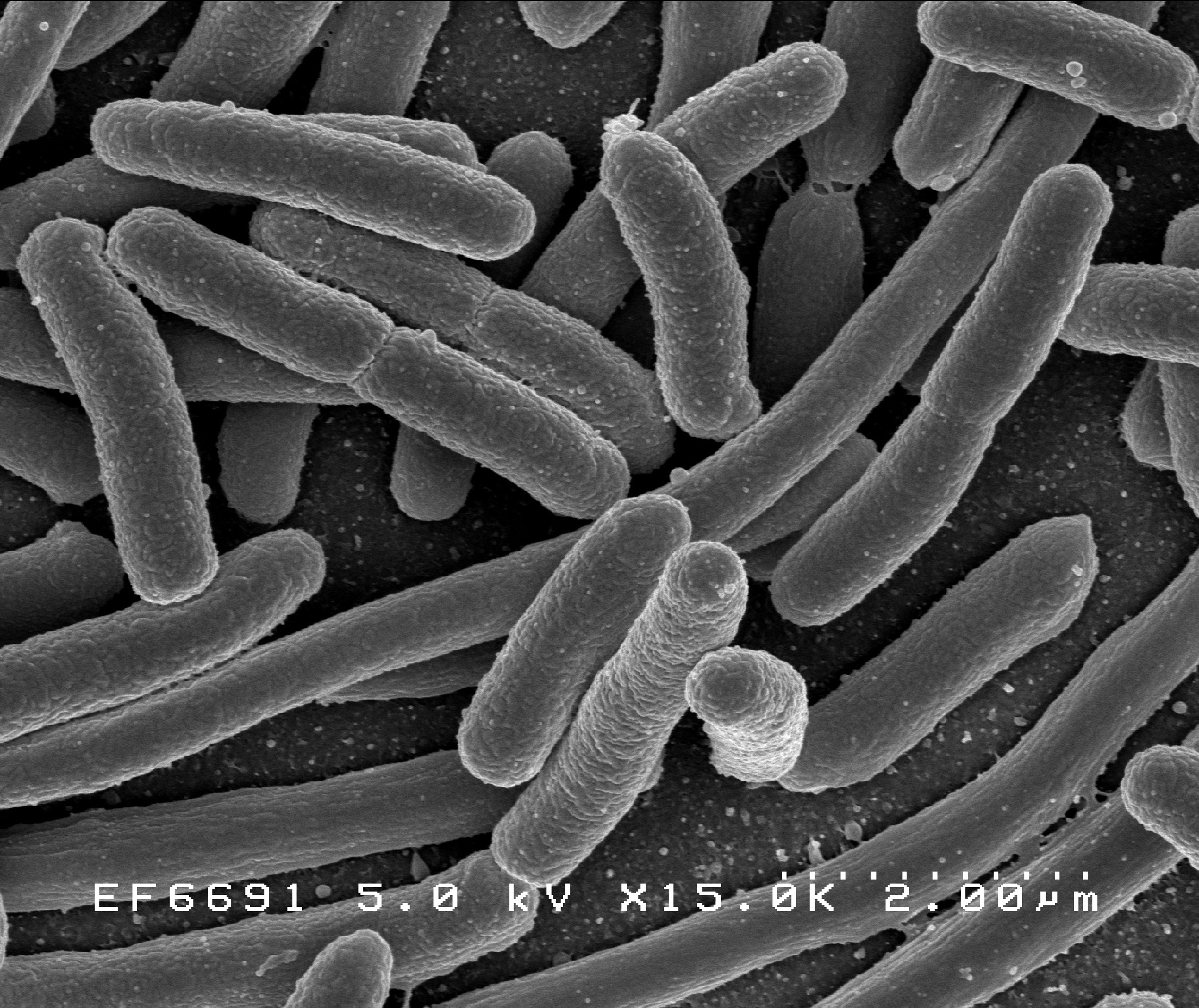
Scanning electron micrograph of E. coli bacteria

Escherichia coli (/ˌɛʃəˈrɪkiə ˈkoʊlaɪ/ ESH-ə-RIK-ee-ə KOH-ly; commonly abbreviated E. coli) is a gram-negative, rod-shaped bacterium that is commonly found in the lower intestine of warm-blooded organisms (endotherms). Most E. coli strains are harmless, but pathogenic varieties cause serious food poisoning, septic shock, meningitis, or urinary tract infections in humans. Unlike normal flora E. coli, the pathogenic varieties produce toxins and other virulence factors that enable them to reside in parts of the body normally not inhabited by E. coli, and to damage host cells. These pathogenic traits are encoded by virulence genes carried only by the pathogens.

== Introduction ==
E. coli and related bacteria constitute about 0.1% of gut flora, and fecal–oral transmission is the major route through which pathogenic strains of the bacterium cause disease. Cells are able to survive outside the body for only a limited amount of time, which makes them ideal indicator organisms to test environmental samples for fecal contamination. The bacterium can also be grown easily and inexpensively in a laboratory setting, and has been intensively investigated for over 60 years. E. coli is the most widely studied prokaryotic model organism, and an important species in the fields of biotechnology and microbiology, where it has served as the host organism for the majority of work with recombinant DNA.

German paediatrician and bacteriologist Theodor Escherich discovered E. coli in 1885, and it is now classified as part of the Gammaproteobacterial family Enterobacteriaceae.

== Serotypes ==
Structure of a lipopolysaccharide

Pathogenic E. coli strains can be categorized based on elements that can elicit an immune response in animals, namely:

1. O antigen: part of lipopolysaccharide layer
2. K antigen: capsule
3. H antigen: flagellin

For example, E. coli strain EDL933 is of the O157:H7 group.

Some, but not all, E. coli fimbrial antigens are also given names in the form of F followed by a number.

=== O antigen ===
The outer membrane of an E. coli cell contains millions of lipopolysaccharide (LPS) molecules, which consists of:

1. O antigen, a polymer of immunogenic repeating oligosaccharides (1–40 units)
2. Core region of phosphorylated nonrepeating oligosaccharides
3. Lipid A (endotoxin)

The O antigen is used for serotyping E. coli and these O group designations go from O1 to O181, with the exception of some groups which have been historically removed, namely O31, O47, O67, O72, O93 (now K84), O94, and O122; groups 174 to 181 are provisional (O174=OX3 and O175=OX7) or are under investigation (176 to 181 are STEC/VTEC). Additionally subtypes exist for many O groups (e.g. O128ab and O128ac). Antibodies towards several O antigens cross-react with other O antigens and partially to K antigens not only from E. coli, but also from other Escherichia species and Enterobacteriaceae species.

The O antigen is encoded by the rfb gene cluster. rol (cld) gene encodes the regulator of lipopolysaccharide O-chain length.

=== K antigen ===
The acidic capsular polysaccharide (CPS) is a thick, mucous-like, layer of polysaccharide that surrounds some pathogen E. coli.

There are two separate groups of K-antigen groups, named group I and group II (while a small in-between subset (K3, K10, and K54/K96) has been classified as group III). The former (I) consist of 100 kDa (large) capsular polysaccharides, while the latter (II), associated with extraintestinal diseases, are under 50 kDa in size.

Group I K antigens are only found with certain O-antigens (O8, O9, O20, and O101 groups), they are further subdivided on the basis of absence (IA, similar to that of Klebsiella species in structure) or presence (IB) of amino sugars and some group I K-antigens are attached to the lipid A-core of the lipopolysaccharide (K_{LPS}), in a similar way to O antigens (and being structurally identical to O antigens in some instances are only considered as K antigens when co-expressed with another authentic O antigen).

Group II K antigens closely resemble those in gram-positive bacteria and greatly differ in composition and are further subdivided according to their acidic components, generally 20–50% of the CPS chains are bound to phospholipids.

In total there are 60 different K antigens that have been recognized (K1, K2a/ac, K3, K4, K5, K6, K7 (=K56), K8, K9 (=O104), K10, K11, K12 (K82), K13(=K20 and =K23), K14, K15, K16, K18a, K18ab (=K22), K19, K24, K26, K27, K28, K29, K30, K31, K34, K37, K39, K40, K41, K42, K43, K44, K45, K46, K47, K49 (O46), K50, K51, K52, K53, K54 (=K96), K55, K74, K84, K85ab/ac (=O141), K87 (=O32), K92, K93, K95, K97, K98, K100, K101, K102, K103, KX104, KX105, and KX106).

=== H antigen ===
The H antigen is a major component of flagella, involved in E. coli movement. It is generally encoded by the fliC gene

There are 53 identified H antigens, numbered from H1 to H56 (H13 and H22 were not E. coli antigens but from Citrobacter freundii, and H50 was found to be the same as H10).

== Role in disease ==
In humans and in domestic animals, virulent strains of E. coli can cause various diseases.

In humans: gastroenteritis, urinary tract infection, and neonatal meningitis. In rarer cases, virulent strains are also responsible for hemolytic-uremic syndrome, peritonitis, mastitis, gram-negative pneumonia and sepsis.

=== Gastrointestinal infection ===
Low-temperature electron micrograph of a cluster of E. coli bacteria, magnified 10,000 times. Each individual bacterium is a rounded cylinder.

Certain strains of E. coli, such as O157:H7, O104:H4, O121, O26, O103, O111, O145, and O104:H21, produce potentially lethal toxins. Food poisoning caused by E. coli can result from eating unwashed vegetables or poorly butchered and undercooked meat.

O157:H7 is also notorious for causing serious and even life-threatening complications such as hemolytic-uremic syndrome. This particular strain is linked to the 2006 United States E. coli outbreak due to fresh spinach.

The O104:H4 strain is equally virulent. Antibiotic and supportive treatment protocols for it are not as well-developed, as it has the ability to be very enterohemorrhagic like O157:H7, causing bloody diarrhea, but also is more enteroaggregative, meaning it adheres well and clumps to intestinal membranes. It is the strain behind the deadly June 2011 E. coli outbreak in Europe. Severity of the illness varies considerably; it can be fatal, particularly to young children, the elderly or the immunocompromised, but is more often mild.

Earlier, poor hygienic methods of preparing meat in Scotland killed seven people in 1996 due to E. coli poisoning, and left hundreds more infected.

E. coli can harbour both heat-stable and heat-labile enterotoxins. The latter, termed LT, contain one A subunit and five B subunits arranged into one holotoxin, and are highly similar in structure and function to cholera toxins. The B subunits assist in adherence and entry of the toxin into host intestinal cells, while the A subunit is cleaved and prevents cells from absorbing water, causing diarrhea. LT is secreted by the Type 2 secretion pathway.

If E. coli bacteria escape the intestinal tract through a perforation (for example from an ulcer, a ruptured appendix, or due to a surgical error) and enter the abdomen, they usually cause peritonitis that can be fatal without prompt treatment. However, E. coli are extremely sensitive to such antibiotics as streptomycin or gentamicin. Recent research suggests treatment of enteropathogenic E. coli with antibiotics may significantly increase the chance of developing haemolytic-uremic syndrome.

Intestinal mucosa-associated E. coli are observed in increased numbers in the inflammatory bowel diseases, Crohn's disease and ulcerative colitis. Invasive strains of E. coli exist in high numbers in the inflamed tissue, and the number of bacteria in the inflamed regions correlates to the severity of the bowel inflammation.

Gastrointestinal infections can cause the body to develop memory T cells to attack gut microbes that are in the intestinal tract. Food poisoning can trigger an immune response to microbial gut bacteria. Some researchers suggest that it can lead to inflammatory bowel disease.

==== Virulence properties ====
Enteric E. coli (EC) are classified on the basis of serological characteristics and virulence properties. The major pathotypes of E. coli that cause diarrhea are listed below.

Name	Hosts	Type of diarrhea	Description
Enterotoxigenic; E. coli (ETEC)	causative agent of diarrhea (without fever) in humans, pigs, sheep, goats, cattle, dogs, and horses	Watery	ETEC uses various colonization factors (CFs) to bind enterocyte cells in the small intestine. ETEC can produce two proteinaceous enterotoxins: The larger of the two proteins, LT enterotoxin, is similar to cholera toxin in structure and function.; The smaller protein, ST enterotoxin causes cGMP accumulation in the target cells and a subsequent secretion of fluid and electrolytes into the intestinal lumen.; ETEC strains are noninvasive, and they do not leave the intestinal lumen. ETEC is the leading bacterial cause of diarrhea in children in the developing world, as well as the most common cause of traveler's diarrhea. Each year, there are estimated to be 840 million cases of ETEC in developing countries. About 280 million of these cases, as well as 325,000 deaths, are in children under the age of five.
Enteropathogenic E. coli (EPEC)	causative agent of diarrhea in humans, rabbits, dogs, cats and horses	Watery	Like ETEC, EPEC also causes diarrhea, but the molecular mechanisms of colonization and aetiology are different. EPEC lack ST and LT toxins, but they use an adhesin known as intimin to bind host intestinal cells. This pathotype has an array of virulence factors that are similar to those found in Shigella. Adherence to the intestinal mucosa causes a rearrangement of actin in the host cell, causing significant deformation. EPEC cells are moderately invasive (i.e. they enter host cells) and elicit an inflammatory response. Changes in intestinal cell ultrastructure due to "attachment and effacement" is likely the prime cause of diarrhea in those afflicted with EPEC.
Enteroaggregative; E. coli (EAEC)	found only in humans	Watery	So named because they have fimbriae which aggregate tissue culture cells, EAEC bind to the intestinal mucosa to cause watery diarrhea without fever. EAEC are noninvasive. They produce a hemolysin and an ST enterotoxin similar to that of ETEC.
Enteroinvasive; E. coli (EIEC)	found only in humans	Bloody or nonbloody	EIEC infection causes a syndrome that is identical to shigellosis, with profuse diarrhea and high fever.
Enterohemorrhagic; E. coli (EHEC)	found in humans, cattle, and goats	Bloody or nonbloody	The most infamous member of this pathotype is strain O157:H7, which causes bloody diarrhea and no fever. EHEC can cause hemolytic-uremic syndrome and sudden kidney failure. It uses bacterial fimbriae for attachment (E. coli common pilus, ECP), is moderately invasive and possesses a phage-encoded shiga toxin that can elicit an intense inflammatory response.
Adherent-Invasive E. coli (AIEC)	found in humans	—	AIEC are able to invade intestinal epithelial cells and replicate intracellularly. It is likely that AIEC are able to proliferate more effectively in hosts with defective innate immunity. They are associated with the ileal mucosa in Crohn's disease.

==== Epidemiology of gastrointestinal infection ====
Transmission of pathogenic E. coli often occurs via fecal–oral transmission. Common routes of transmission include: unhygienic food preparation, farm contamination due to manure fertilization, irrigation of crops with contaminated greywater or raw sewage, feral pigs on cropland, or direct consumption of sewage-contaminated water. Dairy and beef cattle are primary reservoirs of E. coli O157:H7, and they can carry it asymptomatically and shed it in their feces. Food products associated with E. coli outbreaks include cucumber, raw ground beef, raw seed sprouts or spinach, raw milk, unpasteurized juice, unpasteurized cheese and foods contaminated by infected food workers via fecal–oral route. Pathogenic E. coli also transmit efficiently between humans through the fecal-oral route and the basic reproduction number of pandemic lineages is comparable to influenza viruses.

According to the U.S. Food and Drug Administration, the fecal-oral cycle of transmission can be disrupted by cooking food properly, preventing cross-contamination, instituting barriers such as gloves for food workers, instituting health care policies so food industry employees seek treatment when they are ill, pasteurization of juice or dairy products and proper hand washing requirements.

Shiga toxin-producing E. coli (STEC), specifically serotype O157:H7, have also been transmitted by flies, as well as direct contact with farm animals, petting zoo animals, and airborne particles found in animal-rearing environments.

=== Urinary tract infection ===
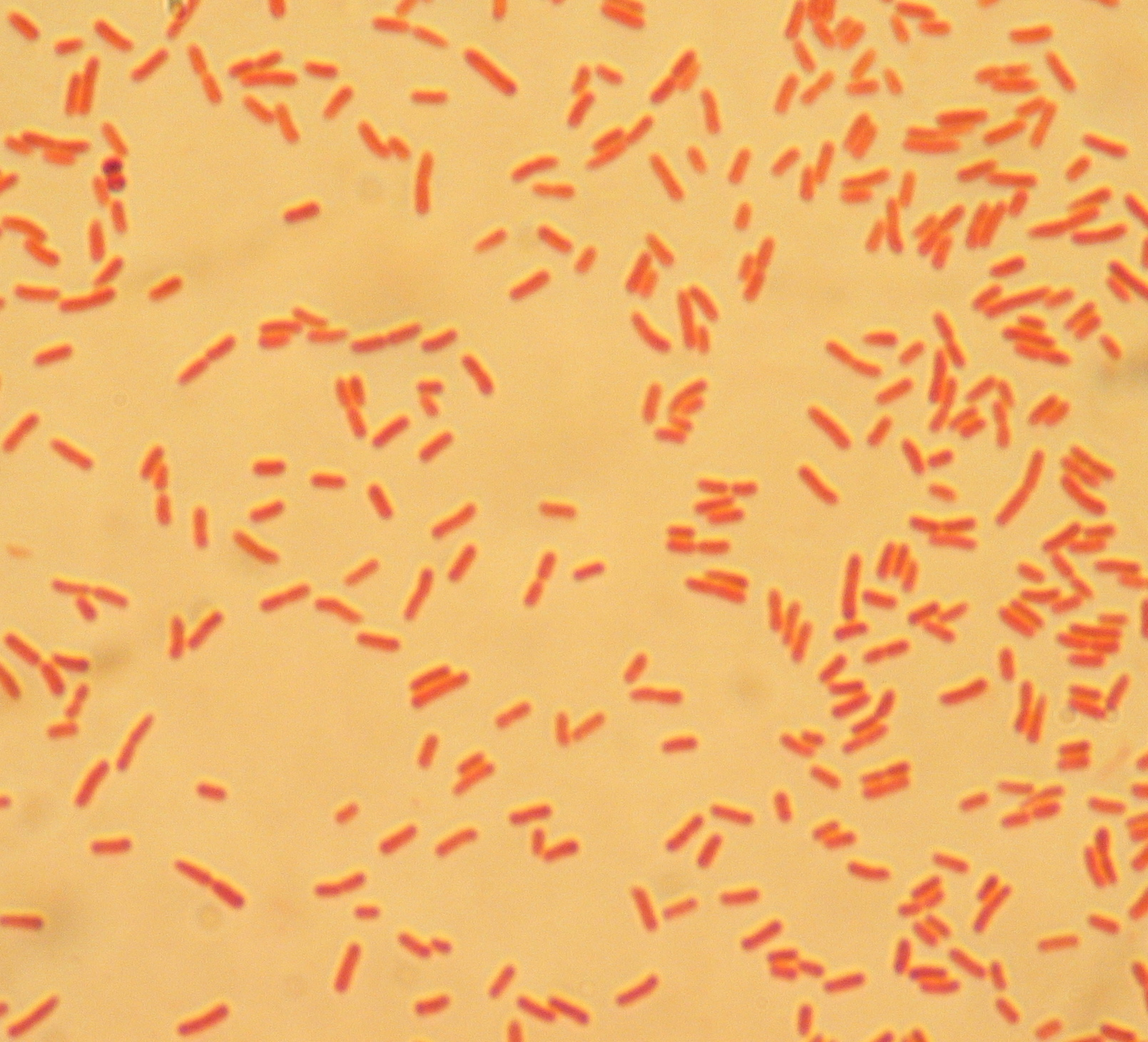
E. coli bacteria

Uropathogenic E. coli (UPEC) is responsible for approximately 90% of urinary tract infections (UTIs) seen in individuals with ordinary anatomy. In ascending infections, fecal bacteria colonize the urethra and spread up the urinary tract to the bladder as well as to the kidneys (causing pyelonephritis), or the prostate in males. Because women have a shorter urethra than men, they are 14 times more likely to suffer from an ascending UTI.

Uropathogenic E. coli use P fimbriae (pyelonephritis-associated pili) to bind urinary tract urothelial cells and colonize the bladder. These adhesins specifically bind D-galactose-D-galactose moieties on the P blood-group antigen of erythrocytes and uroepithelial cells. Approximately 1% of the human population lacks this receptor, and its presence or absence dictates an individual's susceptibility or non-susceptibility, respectively, to E. coli urinary tract infections. Uropathogenic E. coli produce alpha- and beta-hemolysins, which cause lysis of urinary tract cells.

Another virulence factor commonly present in UPEC is the Dr family of adhesins, which are particularly associated with cystitis and pregnancy-associated pyelonephritis. The Dr adhesins bind Dr blood group antigen (Dr^{a}) which is present on decay accelerating factor (DAF) on erythrocytes and other cell types. There, the Dr adhesins induce the development of long cellular extensions that wrap around the bacteria, accompanied by the activation of several signal transduction cascades, including activation of PI-3 kinase.

UPEC can evade the body's innate immune defences (e.g. the complement system) by invading superficial umbrella cells to form intracellular bacterial communities (IBCs). They also have the ability to form K antigen, capsular polysaccharides that contribute to biofilm formation. Biofilm-producing E. coli are recalcitrant to immune factors and antibiotic therapy, and are often responsible for chronic urinary tract infections. K antigen-producing E. coli infections are commonly found in the upper urinary tract.

Descending infections, though relatively rare, occur when E. coli cells enter the upper urinary tract organs (kidneys, bladder or ureters) from the blood stream.

=== Neonatal meningitis (NMEC) ===
It is produced by a serotype of Escherichia coli that contains a capsular antigen called K1. The colonization of the newborn's intestines with these strains, that are present in the mother's vagina, lead to bacteremia, which leads to meningitis. And because of the absence of the IgM antibodies from the mother (these do not cross the placenta because FcRn only mediates the transfer of IgG), plus the fact that the body recognizes as self the K1 antigen, as it resembles the cerebral glycopeptides, this leads to a severe meningitis in the neonates.

=== Possible role in colorectal cancer ===
Some E. coli strains carry a polyketide synthase genomic island (pks), which encodes a multi-enzymatic machinery that produces colibactin, a genotoxic substance that can damage eukaryotic DNA. E. coli that produce colibactin colonize about 20% of humans in high-income countries, where they constitute a part of the healthy gut microbiome. Exposure to colibactin in the gut can cause cellular senescence or DNA damage, producing mutations that may eventually progress to cancer. The mutational signature left by colibactin is particularly enriched in early-onset cases and has been proposed as a cause of their increasing incidence in high-income countries. However, the mucosal barrier prevents E. coli from reaching the surface of enterocytes. Mucin production diminishes in the presence of inflammation. Only when some inflammatory condition co-occurs with E. coli infection is the bacterium able to deliver colibactin to enterocytes and induce tumorogenesis.

=== Animal diseases ===
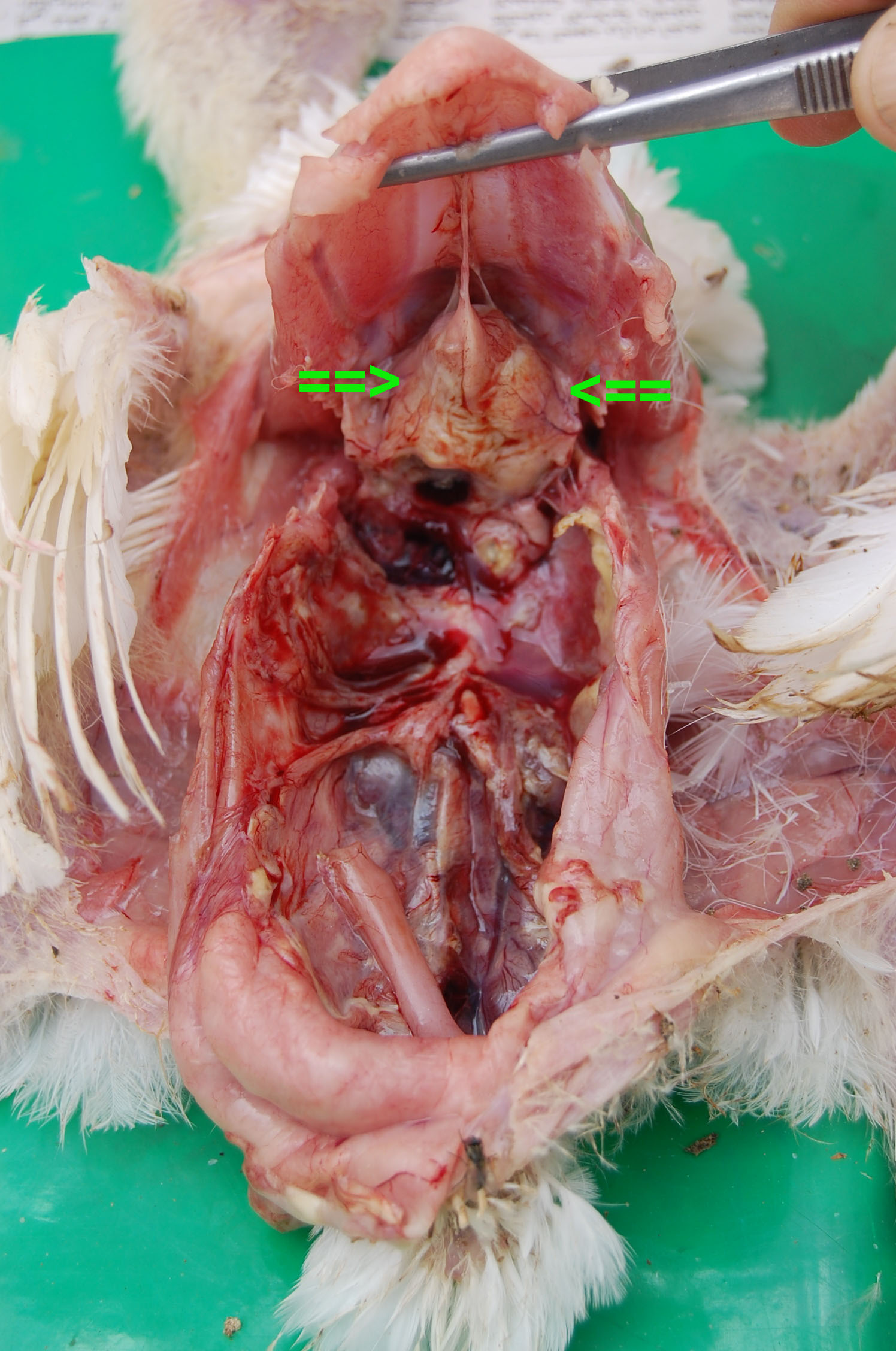
Colibacillosis in domestic chicken

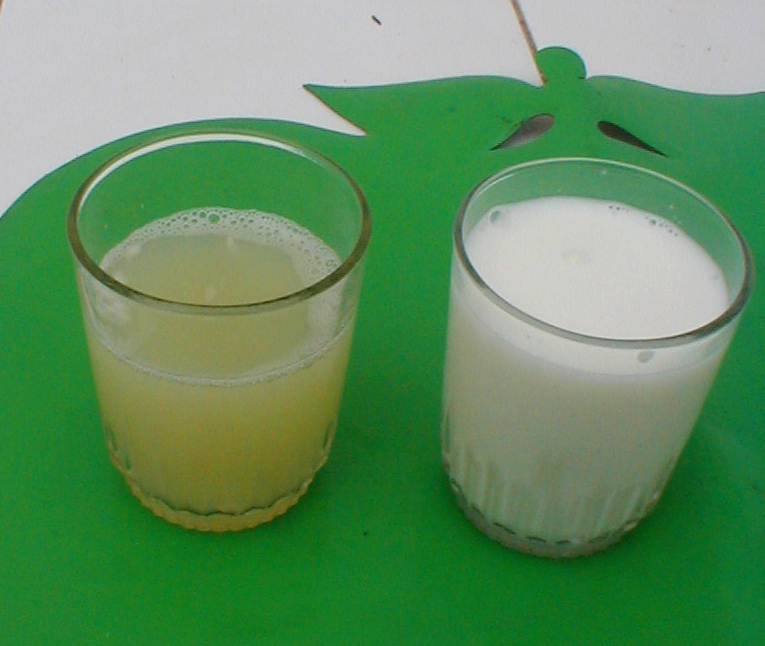
Mastitis in cows

In animals, virulent strains of E. coli are responsible of a variety of diseases, among others sepsis and diarrhea in newborn calves, acute mastitis in dairy cows, colibacillosis also associated with chronic respiratory disease with Mycoplasma where it causes perihepatitis, pericarditis, septicaemic lungs, peritonitis etc. in poultry, and Alabama rot in dogs.

F5 (formerly K99) and F41 are two common fimbrial antigens found in strains that infect calves.

Most of the serotypes isolated from poultry are pathogenic only for birds. So avian sources of E. coli do not seem to be important sources of infections in other animals.

== Laboratory diagnosis ==
Diagnosis of infectious diarrhea and identification of antimicrobial resistance is performed using a stool culture with subsequent antibiotic sensitivity testing. It requires a minimum of two days and maximum of several weeks to culture gastrointestinal pathogens. The sensitivity (true positive) and specificity (true negative) rates for stool culture vary by pathogen, although a number of human pathogens can not be cultured. For culture-positive samples, antimicrobial resistance testing takes an additional 12–24 hours to perform.

Current point of care molecular diagnostic tests can identify E. coli and antimicrobial resistance in the identified strains much faster than culture and sensitivity testing. Microarray-based platforms can identify specific pathogenic strains of E. coli and E. coli-specific AMR genes in two hours or less with high sensitivity and specificity, but the size of the test panel (i.e., total pathogens and antimicrobial resistance genes) is limited. Newer metagenomics-based infectious disease diagnostic platforms are currently being developed to overcome the various limitations of culture and all currently available molecular diagnostic technologies.

In stool samples, microscopy will show gram-negative rods, with no particular cell arrangement. Then, either MacConkey agar or EMB agar (or both) are inoculated with the stool. On MacConkey agar, deep red colonies are produced, as the organism is lactose-positive, and fermentation of this sugar will cause the medium's pH to drop, leading to darkening of the medium. Growth on EMB agar produces black colonies with a greenish-black metallic sheen. This is diagnostic of E. coli. The organism is also lysine positive, and grows on TSI slant with a (A/A/g+/H_{2}S-) profile. Also, IMViC is {+ + – -} for E. coli; as it is indole-positive (red ring) and methyl red-positive (bright red), but VP-negative (no change-colourless) and citrate-negative (no change-green colour). Tests for toxin production can use mammalian cells in tissue culture, which are rapidly killed by shiga toxin. Although sensitive and very specific, this method is slow and expensive.

Typically, diagnosis has been done by culturing on sorbitol-MacConkey medium and then using typing antiserum. However, current latex assays and some typing antisera have shown cross reactions with non-E. coli O157 colonies. Furthermore, not all E. coli O157 strains associated with HUS are nonsorbitol fermentors.

The Council of State and Territorial Epidemiologists recommend that clinical laboratories screen at least all bloody stools for this pathogen. The U.S. Centers for Disease Control and Prevention recommend that

all stools submitted for routine testing from patients with acute community-acquired diarrhea (regardless of patient age, season of the year, or presence or absence of blood in the stool) be simultaneously cultured for E. coli O157:H7 (O157 STEC) and tested with an assay that detects Shiga toxins to detect non-O157 STEC

== Antibiotic therapy and resistance ==
Bacterial infections are usually treated with antibiotics. However, the antibiotic sensitivities of different strains of E. coli vary widely. As gram-negative organisms, E. coli are resistant to many antibiotics that are effective against gram-positive organisms. Antibiotics which may be used to treat E. coli infection include amoxicillin, as well as other semisynthetic penicillins, many cephalosporins, carbapenems, aztreonam, trimethoprim-sulfamethoxazole, ciprofloxacin, nitrofurantoin and the aminoglycosides.

Antibiotic resistance is a growing problem. Some of this is due to overuse of antibiotics in humans, but some of it is probably due to the use of antibiotics as growth promoters in animal feeds. A study published in the journal Science in August 2007 found the rate of adaptative mutations in E. coli is "on the order of 10^{−5} per genome per generation, which is 1,000 times as high as previous estimates," a finding which may have significance for the study and management of bacterial antibiotic resistance.

Antibiotic-resistant E. coli may also pass on the genes responsible for antibiotic resistance to other species of bacteria, such as Staphylococcus aureus, through a process called horizontal gene transfer. E. coli bacteria often carry multiple drug resistance plasmids, and under stress, readily transfer those plasmids to other species. Mixing of species in the intestines allows E. coli to accept and transfer plasmids from and to other bacteria. Thus, E. coli and the other enterobacteria are important reservoirs of transferable antibiotic resistance.

=== Beta-lactamase strains ===
Resistance to beta-lactam antibiotics has become a particular problem in recent decades, as strains of bacteria that produce extended-spectrum beta-lactamases have become more common. These beta-lactamase enzymes make many, if not all, of the penicillins and cephalosporins ineffective as therapy. Extended-spectrum beta-lactamase–producing E. coli (ESBL E. coli) are highly resistant to an array of antibiotics, and infections by these strains are difficult to treat. In many instances, only two oral antibiotics and a very limited group of intravenous antibiotics remain effective. In 2009, a gene called New Delhi metallo-beta-lactamase (shortened NDM-1) that even gives resistance to intravenous antibiotic carbapenem, were discovered in India and Pakistan on E. coli bacteria.

Increased concern about the prevalence of this form of "superbug" in the United Kingdom has led to calls for further monitoring and a UK-wide strategy to deal with infections and the deaths. Susceptibility testing should guide treatment in all infections in which the organism can be isolated for culture.

== Phage therapy ==
Phage therapy—viruses that specifically target pathogenic bacteria—has been developed over the last 80 years, primarily in the former Soviet Union, where it was used to prevent diarrhea caused by E. coli. Presently, phage therapy for humans is available only at the Phage Therapy Center in the Republic of Georgia and in Poland. However, on January 2, 2007, the United States FDA gave Omnilytics approval to apply its E. coli O157:H7 killing phage in a mist, spray or wash on live animals that will be slaughtered for human consumption. The enterobacteria phage T4, a highly studied phage, targets E. coli for infection.

While phage therapy as a treatment for E. coli is unavailable in the US, some commercially available dietary supplements contain strains of phage that target E. coli and have been shown to reduce E. coli load in healthy subjects. This is not considered phage therapy, however, because it does not involve selection of phages with activity against a patient's specific strain of bacterium.

== Vaccination ==
Researchers have actively been working to develop safe, effective vaccines to lower the worldwide incidence of E. coli infection. In March 2006, a vaccine eliciting an immune response against the E. coli O157:H7 O-specific polysaccharide conjugated to recombinant exotoxin A of Pseudomonas aeruginosa (O157-rEPA) was reported to be safe in children two to five years old. Previous work had already indicated it was safe for adults. A phase III clinical trial to verify the large-scale efficacy of the treatment is planned.

In 2006, Fort Dodge Animal Health (Wyeth) introduced an effective, live, attenuated vaccine to control airsacculitis and peritonitis in chickens. The vaccine is a genetically modified avirulent vaccine that has demonstrated protection against O78 and untypeable strains.

In January 2007, the Canadian biopharmaceutical company Bioniche announced it has developed a cattle vaccine which reduces the number of O157:H7 shed in manure by a factor of 1000, to about 1000 pathogenic bacteria per gram of manure.

In April 2009, a Michigan State University researcher announced he had developed a working vaccine for a strain of E. coli. Dr. Mahdi Saeed, Professor of epidemiology and infectious disease in MSU's colleges of Veterinary Medicine and Human Medicine, has applied for a patent for his discovery and has made contact with pharmaceutical companies for commercial production.

In May 2018, a team led by researchers at Washington University School of Medicine collaborated with Johns Hopkins University to conduct a study which delves deeper into the known link between blood type and the severity of E. coli infection. Results of the study showed that "the bacterium is more likely to cause severe diarrhea in people with type A blood," and this finding may aid current and future efforts to develop an effective vaccine against the pathogenic strains of E. coli.

== See also ==
- List of strains of Escherichia coli
