= Escherichia coli O104:H21 =

Serotype of bacterium

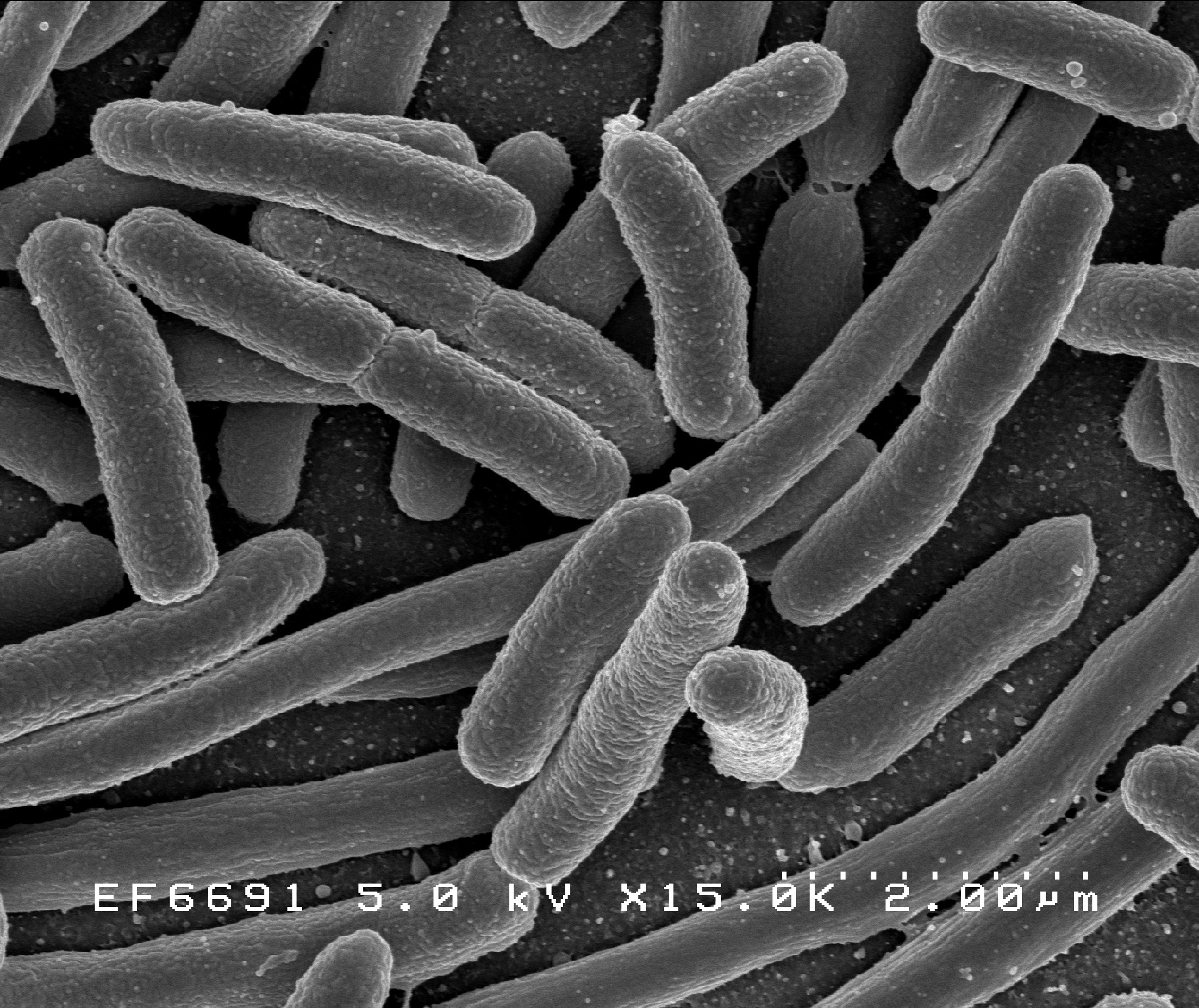
Scanning electron micrograph of Escherichia coli, grown in culture and adhered to a cover slip.

Escherichia coli O104:H21 is a rare serotype of Escherichia coli, a species of bacteria that lives in the lower intestines of mammals. Some serotypes of E. coli have been recognized as pathogenic to humans, e.g. E. coli O157:H7, E. coli O121 and E. coli O104:H21.

== History ==
Escherichia coli O104:H21 was discovered in 1982, when it caused an outbreak of severe bloody diarrhea. It had infected hamburgers, and those affected had eaten these hamburgers not fully cooked.

An outbreak of E. coli responsible for at least 22 deaths in Northern Europe in May 2011 was reported to be caused by another O104 strain, Escherichia coli O104:H4.

== Effects ==
Escherichia coli O104:H21 can cause outbreak of infection similar to that caused by E. coli O157:H7, the most common shiga-like toxin-producing E. coli (SLTEC). SLTECs are the most well-known causes of gastrointestinal illness and diarrhea.

== Treatment ==
The body usually rids itself of harmful E. coli O104:H21 on its own within 5 to 10 days. Antibiotics should not be used, and neither should antidiarrheal agents such as loperamide.

== See also ==
- Escherichia coli
- E. coli O104:H4
- E. coli O157:H7
