= Escherichia coli O121 =

Bacterial variant

Escherichia coli O121 is a pathogenic serotype of Escherichia coli, associated with Shiga toxin, intestinal bleeding, and hemolytic-uremic syndrome (HUS). HUS, if left untreated, can lead to kidney failure.

Most serotypes of E. coli—a widespread species of bacteria residing in the lower intestines of mammals—are beneficial or do not cause disease. Unlike other pathogenic serotypes, such as E. coli O157:H7 (also an enterohemorrhagic E. coli), little is known in detail about the public health significance of O121. Therefore, O121 is sometimes roughly classified as a type of "non-O157 Shiga toxin–producing E. coli " (non-O157 STEC).

== Virulence factors ==
Escherichia coli O121 is a significant Shiga toxin-producing (STEC) serogroup known to cause severe human illness. Its pathogenicity is largely attributed to a variety of virulence genes, many of which are located on mobile genetic elements. A key factor is Shiga toxin 2 (Stx2), encoded by the stx2 gene, which is a potent cytotoxin. Additionally, E. coli O121 possesses the locus of enterocyte effacement (LEE), a pathogenicity island that codes for a type III secretion system (T3SS), the outer membrane protein intimin (encoded by eae), and the translocated intimin receptor (Tir). This system enables the bacterium to attach to intestinal epithelial cells, causing characteristic "attaching and effacing" lesions. Other virulence-associated factors include enterohemolysin (encoded by ehxA) and a secreted serine protease (encoded by espP), which are carried on a large virulence plasmid.

== Outbreak history ==
A U.S. outbreak of E. coli O121 in 2013 sickened 24 people in 15 states according to a statement released by the CDC. New York officials found the bacterium strain in an open package of Farm Rich brand chicken quesadillas from an ill person's home; parent company Rich Products Corp. of Buffalo, New York is now recalling these and several other items and the CDC, USDA, and FDA are now investigating to find the precise source of the outbreak.

In 2016, General Mills recalled 10 million pounds of wheat flour tied to an E. coli O121 outbreak.

In 2024, the Canadian Food Inspection Agency recalled 365 Whole Foods Market brand of organic carrots from Grimmway Farms due to risk of E. coli O121 contamination.

== See also ==
- Escherichia coli O157:H7
