= Carolyn Bohach =

American food scientist

Carolyn Hovde Bohach is an American food scientist, currently a distinguished professor at the University of Idaho.

Her research has focused on enterohemorrhagic Escherichia coli which include the infamous O157:H7 serotype.

== Early life and education ==
Bohach received bachelor of science at the University of Illinois in 1975, a medical technologist (MT) certification from the American Society for Clinical Pathology (ASCP) while at the Swedish Medical Center in 1976 and a doctorate at the University of Minnesota in 1985.

== Career ==
Bohach is currently a distinguished professor at the University of Idaho. Her research is focused on infectious disease with emphasis on the foodborne pathogen E. coli O157:H7. Primary interests are in the relationship of this human pathogen with healthy cattle.
