= Antimotility agent =

Drug used to alleviate the symptoms of diarrhea

Antimotility agents are drugs used to alleviate the symptoms of diarrhea. These include loperamide (Imodium), bismuth subsalicylate (Pepto-Bismol), diphenoxylate with atropine (Lomotil), and opiates such as paregoric, tincture of opium, codeine, and morphine. In diarrhea caused by invasive pathogens such as Salmonella, Shigella, and Campylobacter, the use of such agents has generally been strongly discouraged, though evidence is lacking that they are harmful when administered in combination with antibiotics in Clostridioides difficile cases. Use of antimotility agents in children and the elderly has also been discouraged in treatment of EHEC (Shiga-like toxin producing Escherichia coli) due to an increased rate of hemolytic uremic syndrome.

== Loperamide (Imodium) ==
=== Mechanism of action ===
Loperamide is a μ-opioid receptor agonist. By binding to μ-opioid receptors, loperamide inhibits acetylcholine release and decreases excitation of neurons in the myenteric plexus, which leads to a decrease in peristalsis. Decreasing intestinal motility prolongs the transit time of food content through the digestive tract, which allows for more fluid absorption; thereby alleviating diarrhea symptoms and improving stool consistency and frequency.

Unlike other opiates, loperamide does not cross the blood brain barrier, so there is minimal risk for abuse.

=== Adverse effects ===
Side effects of use of anti-motility agents include:

- Constipation
- Abdominal cramps and discomfort
- Nausea
- Drowsiness
- Dizziness
- Dry mouth
- Skin rash

=== Contraindications ===
Contraindications include:

- Severe liver damage
- Children 2 years old or younger
- Malnourished individuals
- Dehydrated individuals
- Bloody diarrhea present

=== Drug interactions ===
CYP3A4 inhibitors, such as erythromycin, fluconazole, ketoconazole, quinidine, and ritonavir, increase plasma levels of loperamide.

== Bismuth subsalicylate (Pepto-Bismol) ==
=== Mechanism of action ===
Bismuth subsalicylate (BSS) has both antibacterial and anti-secretory actions that help with diarrhea. Once in the gut, BSS gets broken down into bismuth and salicylic acid. Bismuth produces other bismuth salts, which blocks the binding and proliferation of bacteria in stomach mucosal cells, leading to a decrease in inflammation in the intestine. Also, BSS inhibits cyclooxygenase enzyme and leads to a decrease in the production of prostaglandins, which are compounds that increase intestinal inflammation and motility. Lastly, this antidiarrheal agent enhances fluid reabsorption, which helps improve diarrhea symptoms and stool consistency.

=== Adverse effects ===
Adverse effects include:

- Black tongue
- Dark/black stools
- Tinnitus
- Reye's syndrome in children

=== Contraindications ===
Contraindications include:

- Pregnancy
- Children with flu-like symptoms
- Allergy to salicylates
- Presence of gastrointestinal ulcers
- Bleeding disorders (ie. hemophilia)

=== Drug interactions ===
Drug interactions may occur with:

- Warfarin
- Probenecid
- Methotrexate
- Medications containing high salicylate content

== See also ==
- Traveler's diarrhea
- Infectious diarrhea
