= NMEC =

NMEC may refer to:

- National Museum of Egyptian Civilization, history museum in Cario, Egypt
- Neonatal meningitis-causing Escherichia coli, E. coli infection leading to meningitis in newborns
