= Locus of enterocyte effacement-encoded regulator =

The locus of enterocyte effacement-encoded regulator (Ler) is a regulatory protein that controls bacterial pathogenicity of enteropathogenic Escherichia coli (EPEC) and enterohemorrhagic Escherichia coli (EHEC). More specifically, Ler regulates the locus of enterocyte effacement (LEE) pathogenicity island genes, which are responsible for creating intestinal attachment and effacing lesions and subsequent diarrhea: LEE1, LEE2, and LEE3. LEE1, 2, and 3 carry the information necessary for a type III secretion system. The transcript encoding the Ler protein is the open reading frame 1 on the LEE1 operon.

The mechanism of Ler regulation involves competition with histone-like nucleoid structuring protein (H-NS), a negative regulator of the LEE pathogenicity island. Ler is regulated by many factors such as plasmid encoded regulator (Per), integration host factor, Fis, BipA, a positive regulatory loop involving GrlA, and quorum sensing mediated by luxS.

== Mechanism ==
Ler positively regulates the LEE genes by competition with its homolog, H-NS. H-NS silences LEE genes via rigid filament structures bound to the DNA that Ler disrupts and replaces through unknown mechanisms. Though little is known of the mechanism of Ler regulation, Ler interacts with DNA in specific ways. Ler binds DNA non-cooperatively, bends DNA in low concentrations, stiffens it in high concentration, and forms toroidal nucleoprotein complexes along DNA in vivo.

== Regulation ==
The regulation of Ler and its transcript, ler, is complex and many-fold. The plasmid encoded regulator (per) directly activates the region of the LEE1 operon which encodes Ler. Integration host factor is also a direct activator of ler and binds upstream of its promoter.

Jeannette Barba and her colleagues at the National Autonomous University of Mexico elucidated a positive regulatory loop between Ler, ler, GrlA, and grlRA. GrlA is also a LEE encoded regulator of the LEE pathogenicity island. They found that GrlA activates ler, and that Ler activates grlRA indicating a loop of activation wherein a protein product activates a transcript whose protein product activates the transcript of the original protein. Ler activates grlRA only if H-NS is present, this is not the case for GrlA activation of ler.

Quorum sensing plays a role in Ler regulation. LuxS is an important protein involved in quorum sensing, particularly in the synthesis of autoinducer molecules. Quorum-sensing E. coli regulator A (QseA) is found in LuxS systems and activates transcription of ler. Fis, a nucleoid associated protein essential for EPEC's ability to form attaching and effacing lesions, partly acts through activation of Ler expression. BipA, a ribosomal binding GTPase and prolific regulator of EPEC virulence, transcriptionally regulates Ler from an upstream position where it also regulates other genes.

The Ler protein also represses its own transcript on the LEE1 operon through DNA looping which prevents RNA polymerase from completing transcription.
