= Macropinosome =

Cell biology concept

Macropinosomes are a type of cellular compartment that form as a result of macropinocytosis.

== Formation ==
Macropinosomes have been described to form via a wave-like mechanism or via a tent-pole formation both of which processes require rapid polymerisation of actin-rich structures that rise up from the cell surface before collapsing back down into a macropinosome.

== Function ==
Macropinosomes serve primarily in the uptake of solutes from the extracellular fluid. Once inside the cell, macropinosomes undergo a process of maturation characterized by increasing expression of Rab7 as they progress through the endocytic pathway, until they fuse with lysosomes where the contents of the macropinosome are degraded.

== Regulation ==
PI3K and phosphoinositide phospholipase C activation have been shown to be necessary for macropinosome formation in fibroblasts. Members of the SNX family have also been shown to be important in macropinosome formation. Conversely, cyclic AMP has been shown to promote regurgitation from macropinosomes.

== Role in pathogenesis ==
Because the process of macropinocytosis is non-specific, many pathogens take advantage of macropinosomes to infect their target cells. In this way, pathogens internalized in macropinosomes avoid barriers and obstructions that the plasma membrane, cytoplasmic crowding and cortical cytoskeleton pose when moving deeper into the cytoplasm. One example is Zaire ebolavirus, responsible for the devastating ebola virus disease, which stimulates macropinosome formation upon binding to the target cell surface. Vaccinia virus (VACV), a member of Poxviridae family, has also been shown to partially utilize macropinocytosis for infectious cell entry. Here, both infectious forms of VACV, mature virion (MV) and enveloped virion (EV), induce their own macropinocytosis by binding to the cell surface and triggering an actin-mediated plasma membrane protrusion that eventually collapses back onto the plasma membrane sealing the attached virion inside a macropinosome, which then goes through a maturation program that leads to core activation and genome release. Shiga toxin produced by enterohemorrhagic E. coli has been shown to enter target cells via macropinocytosis, causing gastrointestinal tract complications. Other pathogens that have been shown to utilize this mechanism are Kaposi's sarcoma-associated herpesvirus and Salmonella.
