= Enterohemolysin =

Enterohemolysin, also known as EHEC-Hly or Ehx, is a bacterial toxin and a significant virulence factor produced by enterohemorrhagic Escherichia coli (EHEC). It belongs to the Repeats-in-Toxin (RTX) family of pore-forming proteins. The genetic instructions for producing enterohemolysin are located on a large plasmid within the bacteria in an operon designated EHEC-hlyCABD.

This toxin plays a role in the tissue damage observed during EHEC infections, which can lead to severe illnesses such as hemorrhagic colitis and hemolytic-uremic syndrome (HUS). Enterohemolysin exists in two biologically active forms: a free, soluble form and another form associated with outer membrane vesicles (OMVs) released by the bacteria. The OMV-associated form is more stable and has a prolonged hemolytic effect compared to the free toxin. The free form of EHEC-Hly lyses human microvascular endothelial cells by creating pores in the cell membrane. In contrast, the OMV-associated form does not lyse these cells but instead enters them, targets the mitochondria, and induces programmed cell death (apoptosis). Furthermore, EHEC-Hly can stimulate an inflammatory response by prompting human monocytes and macrophages to release interleukin-1β.

== See also ==
- Hemolysin
