= Escherichia coli BL21(DE3) =

Scientific classification
- Domain: Bacteria
- Kingdom: Pseudomonadati
- Phylum: Pseudomonadota
- Class: Gammaproteobacteria
- Order: Enterobacterales
- Family: Enterobacteriaceae
- Genus: Escherichia
- Species: E. coli
- Strain: E. c. BL21(DE3)

Trionomial name
- Escherichia coli BL21(DE3)

Strain of bacteria

Escherichia coli BL21(DE3) is a commonly used protein production strain of the E. coli bacterium. This strain combines several features that allow for excessive expression of heterologous proteins. It is derived from the B lineage of E. coli. More specifically, it is derived from E. coli BL21 by the addition of a lambda prophage element called DE3.

== Naming ==
The genotype of this strain is designated with E. coli str. B F^{–} ompT gal dcm lon hsdS_{B}(r_{B}^{–}m_{B}^{–}) λ(DE3 [lacI lacUV5-T7p07 ind1 sam7 nin5]) [malB^{+}]_{K-12}(λ^{S}). An explanation follows:

str. B
strain B.
F^{–}
No F plasmid.
ompT gal dcm lon
mutations in outer membrane protease ompT (reduces degradation of expressed recombinant proteins), galactose metabolism pathway (cannot use galactose as sole carbon source), DNA cytosine methyltransferase dcm (prevents methylation at C[C]WGG, allowing some restrictive enzymes to work), and ATPase-dependent protease lon (responsible for cytoplasmic proteolysis during stress)
hsdS_{B}(r_{B}^{–}m_{B}^{–})
Mutations of methylation and restriction system genes, parental strain "B".
Incapable of parental-type restriction (r) and methylation (m).
λ(DE3 [lacI lacUV5-T7p07 ind1 sam7 nin5])
A lambda prophage called DE3, containing the modifications lacI (lac repressor), lacUV5-T7p07 (mutant lac promotor called lacUV5 used to drive the T7 RNA polymerase), ind1 (inducible), sam7 ("amber" stop codon used to inactivate phage S gene), nin5 ("N-independent" deletion). Can be abbreviated as "λ(DE3)".
Also notated "λ sBamHIo ∆EcoRI-B int::(lacI::PlacUV5::T7 gene1) i21 ∆nin5", which describes its deletion of a restriction enzyme site, insertion of lacI and lacUV5-T7p07 at the phage int gene, a phage immunity region, and the deletion known as nin5.
[malB^{+}]_{K-12}(λ^{S})
"malB region" transduced from strain K-12 (strictly speaking, W3110) to make the strain Mal^{+} (has complete Mal regulon) λ^{S} (carry a lambda prophage with defective S gene).

== Characteristics ==
=== Decreased proteolysis ===
The proteolysis of heterologously expressed proteins is reduced due to the functional deficiency of two major proteases, Lon and OmpT. Lon is usually present in the cytoplasm of the cell, but in all B strains its production is prevented by an insertion within the promoter sequence. OmpT is located in the outer membrane but is absent in B strains due to deletion.

=== Expression induction ===
While E. coli BL21(DE3) supports the expression of genes under the control of constitutive promoters, it is specifically engineered for IPTG induction of recombinant genes under the control of a T7 promoter. The realized induction strength depends on several factors, including the IPTG concentration and the timing of its supplementation.

This function is enabled by the presence of a recombinant λ-prophage (DE3). DE3 carries a T7 RNA polymerase (RNAP) gene under the control of a lacUV5 promoter (lacUV5-T7 gene 1). T7-RNAP is highly specific to the T7 promoter and orthogonal to native E. coli promoters. Therefore the T7-RNAP only transcribes (exogenously introduced) genes that are regulated by a T7 promoter. The LacUV5 promoter is derived from the E. coli wildtype lac promoter but exhibits an increased transcription strength due to two mutations that facilitate its interaction with a native E. coli RNAP σ-factor.

In E. coli BL21(DE3) the expression of the T7-RNAP is suppressed by the constitutively expressed LacI repressor. LacI binds the lac operator, which is located downstream of the LacUV5 promoter, preventing the production of the T7-RNAP. However, upon supplementation of IPTG, the LacI repressor dissociates from the lac operator, allowing for the expression of T7-RNAP. Subsequently, T7-RNAP can initiate the transcription of a recombinant gene under T7 promoter control.

Other DE3 modifications ensure stable integration of the prophage in the genome and prevent the prophage from entering the lytic cycle (ind1, sam7, and nin5).

=== Facilitated cloning ===
E. coli BL21(DE3) lacks a functional type I restriction-modification system, indicated by hsdS(r_{B}^{−} m_{B}^{−}). Specifically, both the restriction (hsdR) and modification (hsdM) domains are inactive. This enhances transformation efficiency since exogenously introduced unmethylated DNA remains untargeted by the restriction-modification system.

The dcm gene is also rendered inactive, preventing the methylation of a cytosine on both strands within the recognition sequence 5'-CC(A/T)GG-3'. This facilitates further processing of purified DNA as Dcm methylation prevents cleavage by certain restriction enzymes.

== Related strains ==
As mentioned earlier, this strain is directly descended from BL21. B-derived strains in general have the decreased proteolysis and facilitated cloning benefits as described before. As a result, a lot of work has poured into developing them for protein production, and BL21(DE3) is far from the only one.

- BL21, aforementioned. Genotype is the same as DE3, except with the removal of the λ(DE3) part. For a broader comparison with other B strains (specifically, what the [malB^{+}]_{K-12}(λ^{S}) transfer entailed), see Studier et al. (2009).
- BL21-AI, Invitrogen's strain that uses a T7 expression system driven by the tightly regulated arabinose-inducible P_{BAD} promoter (denoted as araB::T7RNAP-tetA in genotype; "::" indicates insertion). It fixes the leaky expression issue seen in BL21 and BL21(DE3).
- BL21Star(DE3), a derivative of BL21(DE3) with a truncation in the rne gene (RNase), which leads to more protein produced. Change is denoted as rne131 in genotype (mutation in rne, allele "131").
- C41/43(DE3), C44/45(DE3) and Mt56(DE3), three attempts at evolving a version of BL21(DE3) more resistant to product toxicity. The selection resulted in lower protein production, mainly due to reduced T7 RNAP activity.
- Evo21(DE3), a mutant of BL21(DE3) produced by "constrained evolution", featuring a truncation in rne. Produces more protein and is more resistant to toxicity.
- Lemo21(DE3), mutant with fhuA2 (phage T1 resistance) and pLemo(Cam^{R}) [chloramphenicol resistance marker] = pACYC184-PrhaBAD-lysY (pACYC184 plasmid with a PrhaBAD promoter + lysY lysozyme gene construct). Allows for using rhamnose to tune the expression of lysY, which inhibits T7 RNAP.
