= Locus of enterocyte effacement =

The locus of enterocyte effacement (LEE) is a moderately conserved pathogenicity island consisting of 35,000 base pairs in the bacteria Escherichia coli genome. The LEE encodes the Type III secretion system and associated molecular chaperones and effector proteins responsible for attaching and effacing (AE) lesions in the large intestine. These proteins include intimin, Tir, EspC, EspF, EspH, and Map protein. The LEE has a 39% G+C ratio.

== See also ==
- Locus of enterocyte effacement-encoded regulator
