= Escherichia coli NC101 =

Scientific classification
- Domain: Bacteria
- Kingdom: Pseudomonadati
- Phylum: Pseudomonadota
- Class: Gammaproteobacteria
- Order: Enterobacterales
- Family: Enterobacteriaceae
- Genus: Escherichia
- Species: E. coli
- Strain: E. c. NC101

Trionomial name
- Escherichia coli NC101 Kim et al. 2005

Strain of bacterium

Escherichia coli (AIEC) NC101 is a mouse isolate, serotype O2:H6/41, that is pro-carcinogenic, adherent-invasive (AIEC), probiotic strain of Escherichia coli, a species of bacteria that thrives in the intestines of mammals. NC101 has also been identified as a nicotinic acid (NA) auxotroph, a pathobiont, which is an organism that is harmful under certain circumstances, and is an important, relevant model organism that demonstrates how susceptible individuals may produce inappropriate immune responses to seemingly benign intestinal E. coli.

== History ==
NC101 was first isolated and found from a specific pathogen-free wild-type mouse at the North Carolina State University between 2004 and 2005. Sequencing of NC101 showed it has a missense mutation in nadA, a gene that encodes for quinolinate synthase A, which is necessary for de novo nicotinamide adenine dinucleotide (NAD) biosynthesis.

== Effects ==
E. coli NC101 has been found to promote carcinoma specifically, mucinous adenocarcinoma, in while performing experiments in azoxymethane treated mice. The findings of the study found "...tumorigenesis by altering microbial composition and inducing the expansion of microorganisms with genotoxic capabilities." The frequency of specific E. coli strains like NC101 in laboratory mouse colonies is currently unknown.

== See also ==
- Escherichia coli
- Escherichia
- Pseudomonadota
- Enterobacteriacae
