= 2006 North American E. coli O157:H7 outbreaks =

In 2006, there were several outbreaks of foodborne illness from spinach and lettuce contaminated by E. coli O157:H7.

== Spinach ==
The initial outbreak occurred in September 2006 and its probable origin was an Angus cattle ranch that had leased land to a spinach grower (growing under organic practices). At least 205 consumer illnesses and three deaths have been attributed to the tainted produce.

== Lettuce ==
=== Taco Bell ===
The affected New Jersey counties, as of December 7, 2006. Note that Montgomery and Philadelphia counties in Pennsylvania and Nassau, Suffolk, Clinton, Orange, Oneida, and Otsego counties in New York State were also affected.

In December 2006, Taco Bell restaurants in four Northeastern states emerged as a common link among 71 sickened people across five states, 52 of whom were ultimately confirmed by the Centers for Disease Control to have tested positive the same E. coli strain. A total of 33 people in New Jersey, 22 in New York, 13 in Pennsylvania, 2 in Delaware, and 1 in South Carolina fell ill, according to the CDC.

The four states with Taco Bell restaurants where these consumers were confirmed to have eaten were in New Jersey, New York, Pennsylvania, and Delaware. (The patient from South Carolina ate at a Taco Bell restaurant in Pennsylvania).

Of the 71 reported cases, 53 were hospitalized and 8 developed a type of kidney failure called hemolytic–uremic syndrome. According to the CDC, illness onset dates ranged from November 20 to December 6.

On December 7, 2006, an initial investigation attributed the outbreak to green onions, which had been supplied to the Taco Bell restaurants by a single McLane Company distribution center in Burlington Township, New Jersey.

Tainted green onions may have proven a ready culprit in part because of their involvement in at least one widely reported prior outbreak of E. coli. In 2003, green onions were suspected as the cause of a foodborne illness involving the Chi-Chi's restaurant chain in western Pennsylvania that killed 4 people and sickened 660.

After further investigation, Taco Bell determined that the cause of the problem was with lettuce, not green onions, and switched produce suppliers in the New York, New Jersey, Pennsylvania, and Delaware area. Company president Greg Creed stated in a press release that Taco Bell was cooperating with the CDC and the FDA in the controversy and he also stated that two of the people who claimed they got sick from eating Taco Bell actually did not eat there. Even though green onions were proven to not be the source of Taco Bell's E. coli outbreak, Taco Bell has no plans to put them back on the menu.

By mid-December 2006, both green onions and McLane Company had been eliminated as possible sources of the Taco Bell contamination.

=== Taco John's ===
Later in December 2006, Iowa and Minnesota health officials investigated an E. coli outbreak that was traced to foods served at Taco John's restaurants in Cedar Falls, Iowa and Albert Lea and Austin, Minnesota. As of December 13, 2006, the Iowa Department of Health had confirmed that at least 50 Iowans had become ill with E. coli infections after eating at Taco John's. On December 18, 2006, the Minnesota Department of Health reported that 37 probable E. coli cases had been reported in connection with the Taco John's E. coli outbreak, nine people were confirmed ill with E. coli, eight people were hospitalized, and one person had developed hemolytic-uremic syndrome.

The Taco John's E. coli outbreak was traced to contaminated lettuce sold in foods at Taco John's restaurants that were supplied by a Minneapolis lettuce supplier. In response to the Taco John's E. coli outbreak, Taco John's agreed to reimburse ill individuals for medical expenses, and hired a new fresh produce supplier. Taco John's president and CEO Paul Fisherkeller stated in an open letter that their restaurant food was safe to eat in the wake of the E. coli outbreak that closed three of their restaurants in Iowa and Minnesota.

== Other reported 2006 outbreaks ==
A report of a viral outbreak at an Olive Garden restaurant in Indianapolis, Indiana, occurred in mid-December.

== Regulatory and industry response ==
Since the 2006 outbreaks, various legislative proposals have emerged and the state and federal levels to require stricter food production, processing and handling. Industry participants have also taken voluntary measures to improve food safety.

Following the outbreak in 2006, the California Leafy Greens Handler Marketing Agreement (LGMA) was established in the spring of 2007. The LGMA, operating with oversight from the California Department of Food and Agriculture, provides a mechanism for verifying that farmers follow established food safety practices for lettuce, spinach and other leafy greens. Farmers, shippers and processors in California have demonstrated their willingness to follow a set of food safety practices by signing onto the LGMA. Once a company joins the LGMA, it becomes mandatory for that member company to sell and ship produce only from farmers who comply with the LGMA accepted food safety practices. The grocery stores and restaurants who buy California leafy greens products support the food safety program by only purchasing these products from the LGMA member companies who passed mandatory government inspections. The California LGMA has now become a model program for farmers in other states.

== See also ==
- Spinach in the United States
