= Tir (receptor) =

Receptor used by enteropathogenic Escherichia coli

Tir (translocated intimin receptor) is an essential component in the adherence of the enteropathogenic Escherichia coli (EPEC) and enterohemorrhagic Escherichia coli (EHEC) to the cells lining the small intestine. To aid attachment, both EPEC and EHEC possess the ability to reorganise the host cell actin cytoskeleton via the secretion of virulence factors. These factors are secreted directly into the cells using a Type three secretion system. One of the virulence factors secreted is the Translocated Intimin Receptor (Tir). Tir is a receptor protein encoded by the espE gene which is located on the locus of enterocyte effacement (LEE) pathogenicity island in EPEC strains. It is secreted into the host cell membranes and acts as a receptor for intimin which is found on the bacterial surface. Once Tir binds intimin, the bacterium is attached to the enterocyte surface.

Tir is also a receptor tyrosine kinase (RTK) that initiates its intimate adherence by inserting a hairpin orientation in the intestinal cell membrane to enable tight binding to intimin on the bacterial cell outer membrane. Upon phosphorylation, Tir activates condensation and polymerization of actin filaments under the bacterial cell to form a pedestal-like structure.
