= Heat-stable enterotoxin =

Class of bacterial toxins

Heat-stable enterotoxin B, secretory
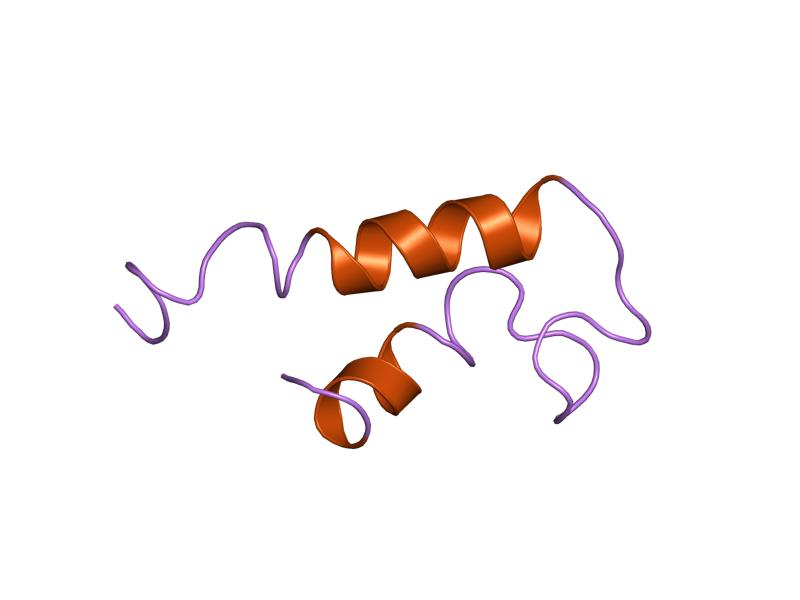
- Structure of Escherichia coli heat-stable enterotoxin b.

Identifiers
- Symbol: STb_secrete
- Pfam: PF09075
- InterPro: IPR015160
- PROSITE: PDOC00246
- SCOP2: 1ehs / SCOPe / SUPFAM
- OPM superfamily: 88
- OPM protein: 1ehs
Available protein structures:
- PDB: IPR015160 PF09075 (ECOD; PDBsum)
- AlphaFold: IPR015160; PF09075

Heat-stable enterotoxin ST
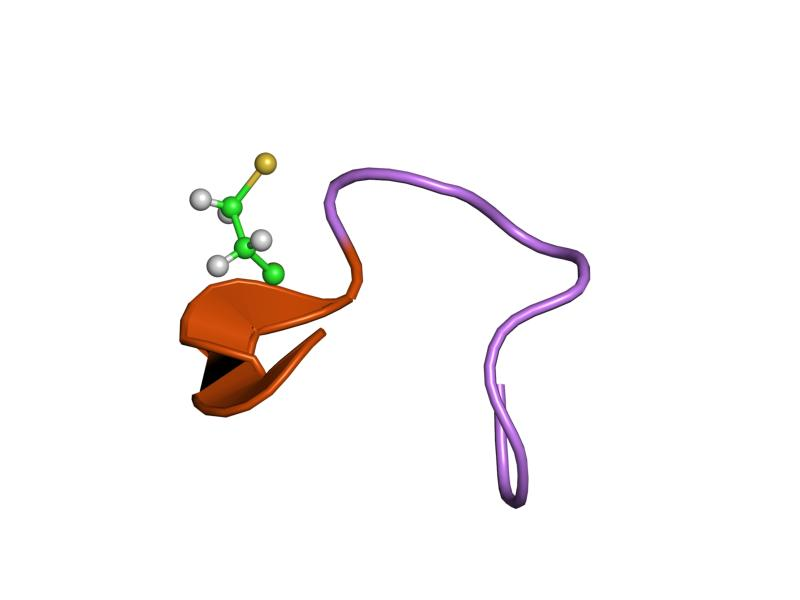
- structural characteristics for biological activity of heat-stable enterotoxin produced by enterotoxigenic escherichia coli: x-ray crystallography of weakly toxic and nontoxic analogs

Identifiers
- Symbol: Enterotoxin_ST
- Pfam: PF02048
- InterPro: IPR001489
- PROSITE: PDOC00246
- SCOP2: 1etn / SCOPe / SUPFAM
- OPM superfamily: 162
- OPM protein: 1etn
Available protein structures:
- PDB: IPR001489 PF02048 (ECOD; PDBsum)
- AlphaFold: IPR001489; PF02048

Heat stable E.coli enterotoxin 1

Identifiers
- Symbol: Enterotoxin_HS1
- Pfam: PF08090
- InterPro: IPR012557
Available protein structures:
- PDB: IPR012557 PF08090 (ECOD; PDBsum)
- AlphaFold: IPR012557; PF08090

Heat-stable enterotoxins (STs) are secretory peptides produced by some bacterial strains, such as enterotoxigenic Escherichia coli which are in general toxic to animals.

These peptides keep their 3D structure and remain active at temperatures as high as 100 °C.

== Function ==
Different STs recognize distinct receptors on the surface of animal cells and thereby affect different intracellular signaling pathways. For example, STa enterotoxins bind and activate membrane-bound guanylate cyclase, which leads to the intracellular accumulation of cyclic GMP and downstream effects on several signaling pathways. These events lead to the loss of electrolytes and water from intestinal cells.

Heat-stable toxin 1 of entero-aggregative Escherichia coli (EAST1) is a small toxin. It is not, however, solely associated with entero-aggregative E. coli but also with many other diarrhoeic E. coli families. Some studies have established the role of EAST1 in some human outbreaks of diarrhoea. Isolates from farm animals have been shown to carry the astA gene coding for EAST1. However, the relation between the presence of EAST1 and disease is not conclusive.

== Structure ==
The mature STa protein from Escherichia coli, which is the cause of acute diarrhoea in infants and travellers in developing countries, is a 19-residue peptide containing three disulphide bridges that are functionally important. STa contains an N-terminal signal peptide composed of two domains, Pre and Pro, involved in extracellular toxin release, and a core enterotoxigenic domain.

Members of heat-stable enterotoxin B family assume a helical secondary structure, with two alpha helices forming a disulfide cross-linked alpha-helical hairpin. The disulfide bonds are crucial for the toxic activity of the protein, and are required for maintenance of the tertiary structure, and subsequent interaction with the particulate form of guanylate cyclase, increasing cyclic GMP levels within the host intestinal epithelial cells.
