= LacUV5 =

The lacUV5 promoter is a mutated promoter from the Escherichia coli lac operon which is used in molecular biology to drive gene expression on a plasmid. lacUV5 is very similar to the classical lac promoter, containing just 2 base pair mutations in the -10 hexamer region, compared to the lac promoter. LacUV5 is among the most commonly used promoters in molecular biology because it requires no additional activators and it drives high levels of gene expression.

The lacUV5 promoter sequence conforms more closely to the consensus sequence recognized by bacterial sigma factors than the traditional lac promoter does. Due to this, lacUV5 recruits RNA Polymerase more effectively, thus leading to higher transcription of target genes. Additionally, unlike the lac promoter, lacUV5 works independently of activator proteins or other cis regulatory elements (apart from the -10 and -35 promoter regions). While no activators are required, lacUV5 promoter expression can be regulated by the LacI repressor and can be induced with IPTG, which is an effective inducer of protein expression when used in the concentration range of 100 μM to 1.5 mM. Due to this control, the lacUV5 promoter is commonly found on expression plasmids and is used when controllable but high levels of a product are desired.

The lacUV5 mutation was first identified in 1970 in a study of lac promoter mutants that produce higher yields. Some of them, including UV5, has lost catabolite repression at the CAP site. Development into cloning vectors is known since 1982, when a UV5-carrying phage known as "λ h80 lacUV5 cI857" has its genome spliced with the HaeIII restriction enzyme to make plasmids carrying the fragment with UV5.

== Sequence ==
Modern lacUV5 is seen in the BL21(DE3) strain, which carries both a lac operon with the standard promoter and a lacUV5 operon split by the DE3 prophage (and as a result driving the T7 RNA polymerase instead). The two important mutations are underlined.

lacUV5  TCACTCATTAGGCACCCCAGGCTTTACACTTTATGCTTCCGGCTCGTATAATGTGTGGAATTGTGAGCGGATAACAATTTCACACAGGAAACAGCT[6]
LacZ    TCACTCATTAGGCACCCCAGGCTTTACACTTTATGCTTCCGGCTCGTATGTTGTGTGAAATTGTGAGCGGATAACAATTTCACACAGGAAACAGCT[7]
  position                     ^-35                     ^-10       ^+1
