= Escherichia coli O104:H4 =

Scientific classification
- Domain: Bacteria
- Kingdom: Pseudomonadati
- Phylum: Pseudomonadota
- Class: Gammaproteobacteria
- Order: Enterobacterales
- Family: Enterobacteriaceae
- Genus: Escherichia
- Species: E. coli
- Serovar: E. c. O104:H4

Trionomial name
- Escherichia coli O104:H4

Strain of bacteria

Escherichia coli O104:H4 is an enteroaggregative Escherichia coli serovar of the bacterium Escherichia coli, and the cause of the 2011 Escherichia coli O104:H4 outbreak. The "O" in the serological classification identifies the cell wall lipopolysaccharide antigen, and the "H" identifies the flagella antigen.

Analysis of genomic sequences obtained by BGI Shenzhen shows that the O104:H4 outbreak strain is an enteroaggregative E. coli (EAEC or EAggEC) type that has acquired Shiga toxin genes, presumably by horizontal gene transfer.

Genome assembly and copy-number analysis both confirmed that two copies of the Shiga toxin stx2 prophage gene cluster are a distinctive characteristic of the genome of the O104:H4 outbreak strain. The O104:H4 strain is characterized by these genetic markers:

- Shiga toxin stx2 positive
- tellurite resistance gene cluster positive
- intimin adherence gene negative
- β-lactamases ampC, ampD, ampE, ampG, ampH are present.

The European Commission (EC) integrated approach to food safety defines a case of Shiga-like toxin-producing E. coli (STEC) diarrhea caused by O104:H4 by an acute onset of diarrhea or bloody diarrhea together with the detection of the Shiga toxin 2 (Stx2) or the Shiga gene stx2.

Prior to the 2011 outbreak, only one case identified as O104:H4 had been observed, in a woman in South Korea in 2005.

== Pathophysiology ==
E. coli O104 is a Shiga toxin–producing E. coli (STEC). The toxins cause illness and the associated symptoms by sticking to the intestinal cells and aggravating the cells along the intestinal wall. This, in turn, can cause bloody stools to occur. Another effect from this bacterial infection is hemolytic uremic syndrome (HUS), which is a condition characterized by destruction of red blood cells, that over a long period of time can cause kidney failure. Some common symptoms of HUS are vomiting, bloody diarrhea, and blood in the urine.

== Infection ==
A common mode of E. coli O104:H4 infection involves ingestion of fecally contaminated food; the disease can thus be considered a foodborne illness. Most recently in 2011, an outbreak of the O104:H4 strain in Germany caused the deaths of several people, and hundreds were hospitalised. German authorities traced the infection back to fenugreek sprouts grown from contaminated seeds imported from Egypt, but these results are debated.

== Diagnosis ==
To diagnose infection with STEC, a patient's stool (feces) can be tested in a laboratory for the presence of Shiga toxin. Testing methods used include direct detection of the toxin by immunoassay, or detection of the stx2 gene or other virulence-factor genes by PCR. If infection with STEC is confirmed, the E. coli strain may be serotyped to determine whether O104:H4 is present.

== Treatment ==
E. coli O104:H4 is difficult to treat as it is resistant to many antibiotics, although it is susceptible to carbapenems.

== Prevention ==
Spread of E. coli is prevented simply by thorough hand-washing with soap, washing and hygienically preparing food, and properly heating/cooking food, so the bacteria are destroyed.
