= Enteroaggregative Escherichia coli =

- Specialty: Infectious disease

Enteroaggregative Escherichia coli (EAEC or EAggEC) are a pathotype of Escherichia coli which cause acute and chronic diarrhea in both the developed and developing world. They may also cause urinary tract infections. EAEC are defined by their "stacked-brick" pattern of adhesion to the human laryngeal epithelial cell line HEp-2. The pathogenesis of EAEC involves the aggregation of and adherence of the bacteria to the intestinal mucosa, where they elaborate enterotoxins and cytotoxins that damage host cells and induce inflammation that results in diarrhea.

EAEC is now recognized as an emerging enteric pathogen. In particular, EAEC are reported as the second most common cause of traveler's diarrhea, second only to Enterotoxigenic E. coli, and a common cause of diarrhea amongst pediatric populations. It has also been associated with chronic infections in the latter, as well as in immunocompromised hosts, such as HIV-infected individuals. Awareness of EAEC was increased by a serious outbreak in Germany during 2011, causing over 5000 cases and at least 50 fatalities. The pathogen responsible was found to be an EAEC O104:H4 strain which was lysogenized by a Shiga toxin encoding phage (typically associated with Shiga toxin-producing Escherichia coli, which often encode the adhesin intimin). The putative cause of the outbreak were sprouted fenugreek seeds.

Strains of EAEC are highly genetically heterogeneous, and the identification of virulence factors important for pathogenesis has proven difficult. Many EAEC encode a transcriptional factor named aggR (aggregative regulator), part of the AraC family of transcription activators. AggR regulates many plasmid, as well chromosomally encoded, virulence factors, that include genes implicated in aggregative adherence fimbriae biogenesis and toxin production. Several toxins have been linked to EAEC virulence, including ShET1 (Shigella enterotoxin 1), Pet (plasmid‐encoded toxin), and EAST-1. However, further studies of these factors have failed to elucidate their role in pathogenesis.

== Classification ==
Developing Countries in 2007

Diarrhea is still an important disease burden worldwide. It causes considerable childhood mortality in the developing world and is correlated with morbidity (or of relating to disease) and substation health care costs in industrialized countries. E. coli is a bacterium that is normally found in the human intestine, but some strains of bacteria can cause illness and infection. Subgroups of diarrheagenic Escherichia coli (DEC) are the following: enteroinvasive E. coli (EIEC), enteropathogenic E. coli (EPEC), enterotoxigenic E.coli (ETEC), Shiga toxin-producing E. coli (STEC) and Enteroaggregative E. coli (EAEC).

== Symptoms and Causes ==
Enteroaggregative Escherichia coli (EAEC) is a type of strain from E.coli. E.coli causes intestinal infections, some intestinal infections include diarrhea, fever and abdominal pain. Most severe cases can lead to bloody diarrhea, dehydration or even kidney failure. People with weakened immune systems, young children, older adults and pregnant women are at increased risks for developing these complications. Symptoms of intestinal infection usually begin between 8 and 52 hours after you have been infected with E.coli, this is the incubation period. The incubation period is the time between catching an infection and symptoms appearing.

Symptoms:

- abdominal cramping, pain or tenderness
- watery or mucoidy diarrhea
- nausea and vomiting, in some people

Bloody diarrhea has only been observed in children, and only rarely. On the other hand, the STEC-EAEC hybrid strain identified in the 2011 Germany outbreak caused bloody diarrhea. Common sources of infection include:

- contaminated water – Human and animal feces may pollute ground and surface water, including streams, lakes, rivers, and water used to water or irrigate crops. Although public water systems use chlorine and other chemicals to kill such organisms like E. coli, some outbreaks have been linked to contaminated water supplies.
- contaminated food – the most common way to get an E.coli infection is by eating contaminated food such as ground beef, unpasteurized milk and fresh produce.
- improper food handling – by consuming raw food, or not cooking the food properly, especially meats and poultry. It can also be transmitted by not cleaning your cooking utensils properly, causing cross contamination.
- person to person – E.coli can be easily transmitted from person to person, especially when infected children and adults don't wash their hands properly.

== Diagnosis ==
Diagnosis of infectious diarrhea and identification of antimicrobial resistance is performed using a stool culture with subsequent antibiotic sensitivity testing. It requires a minimum of 2 days and maximum of several weeks to culture gastrointestinal pathogens. The sensitivity (true positive) and specificity (true negative) rates for stool culture vary by pathogen, although a number of human pathogens can not be cultured. For culture-positive samples, antimicrobial resistance testing takes an additional 12–24 hours to perform.

Current point of care molecular diagnostic tests can identify EAEC and antimicrobial resistance in the identified strains much faster than culture and sensitivity testing. Microarray-based platforms can identify EAEC and AMR genes in two hours or less with high sensitivity and specificity, but the size of the test panel (i.e., total pathogens and AMR genes) is limited. Newer metagenomics-based infectious disease diagnostic platforms are currently being developed to overcome the various limitations of culture and all currently available molecular diagnostic technologies.

== Treatment ==
Chemical structure of ciprofloxacin

Antibiotics are a type of medicine that is used to destroy or inhibit the growth of microorganisms. Antibiotics are not recommended in mild cases, but doctors may prescribe them in moderate to severe illness.

Studies have suggested that azithromycin or ciprofloxacin, may be the most effective antibiotics when treating Enteroaggregative E.coli (EAEC) infections. If either antibiotic isn't effective after 24 hours, a 3-day course of rifaximin is recommended. Unfortunately, resistance toward ciprofloxacin in Enteroaggregative E.coli (EAEC) strains has been reported in several studies.

For most people treatments include rest and the intake of fluids. Patients with profuse diarrhea or vomit should be rehydrated by drinking much water or by drinking rehydration solutions such as Rehydralyte or Pedialyte.

== Pathogenesis ==
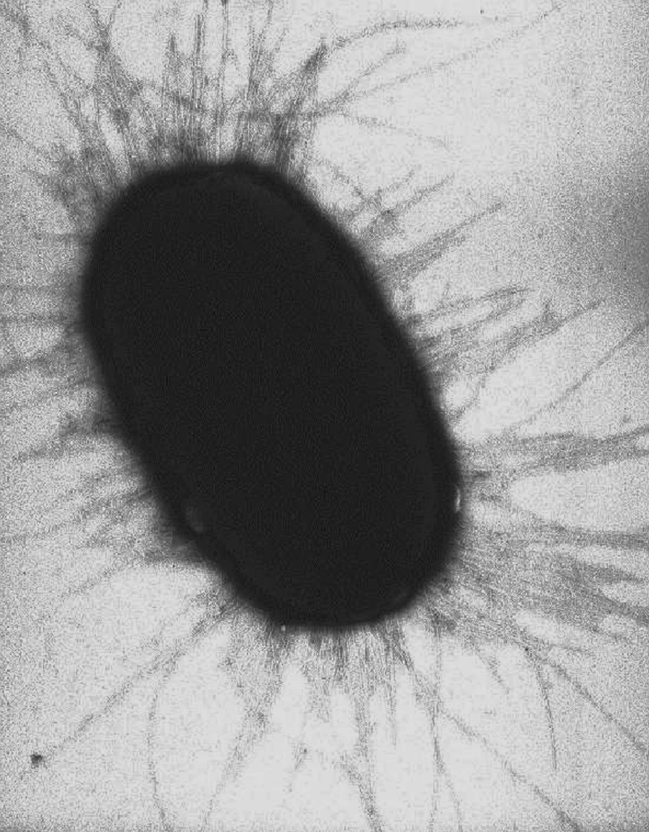
E. coli fimbriae

EAEC is transmitted through the fecal-oral route and primarily contaminated by food and water. EAEC has been associated with many symptoms such as diarrhea in some individuals and intestinal colonization in others. Because many strains of EAEC have been identified, it is difficult to identify the mechanism of its pathogenesis. Most candidate virulence genes are not always connected with disease. The model of EAEC pathogenesis comprises three stages: Stage 1 is the attachment of the intestinal mucosa by aggregative adherence fimbriae (AAF) and other adhering projections, Stage 2 an increase in mucus that covers EAEC on its surface of enterocytes is found; Stage 3 evocation of an inflammatory response, mucosal toxicity, and intestinal secretion as well as a release of toxins exist.

Stage One: Aggregative adherence factors (AAF) are responsible for the adhesion to the intestinal mucosa. AAF are made up of three fimbriae encoded by the pAA plasmid; aag aafA agg-3. aggA is in charge of aggregative phenotype and human erythrocyte haemagglutination of EAEC. aafA allows EAEC to adhere to the intestinal mucosa. agg-3 serves as an adhesion. MAP, three-membrane associated proteins, are essential in the EAEC adherence to haemagglutination of animal cells.

Stage two: After AAF factors in stage 1, adherence to the mucosa is characterized by the presence a biofilm. The production of biofilm is regulated by AggR and demands several genes. The loss of biofilm production and diffuse adherence pattern was reported in EAEC at a pH of 4.0. Many studies reveal that EAEC are capable of surviving in the mucus layer. This evidence can support why malnourished children who are infected with EAEC and live in poor conditions develop mucoid stools and prolonged diarrhea.

Stage Three: Cytotoxic effects are found in the release of toxins in EAEC as well as an elicitation of the inflammatory response, mucosal toxicity, and intestinal secretion. EAEC toxins are destructive to the intestinal villi and enterocytes. There are three toxins found in EAEC; plasmid encoded toxin (Pet), heat-stable toxin (EAST1), and Shigella enterotoxin 1 (ShET1).

== History ==
E. coli has been involved as agents of diarrheal disease since 1920. Enteroaggregative Escheichia coli (EAEC) was first found in 1987, in a child in Lima, Peru. Since 1987, Enteroaggregative Escheichia coli (EAEC) has been recognized as agents of diarrhea in industrialized and developing countries, and is a common cause of traveler's diarrhea. Enteroaggregative Escheichia coli (EAEC) is commonly found in the stools of asymptomatic children in low-income countries, where it may be associated with linear growth faltering.
