= Intimin =

Intimin C-type lectin domain
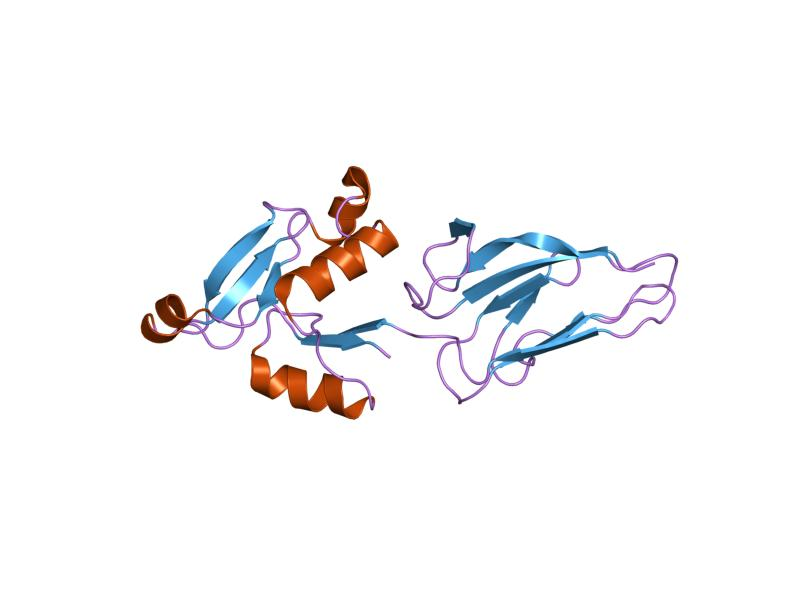
- nmr representative structure of intimin-190 (int190) from enteropathogenic e. coli

Identifiers
- Symbol: Intimin_C
- Pfam: PF07979
- Pfam clan: CL0056
- InterPro: IPR013117
Available protein structures:
- PDB: IPR013117 PF07979 (ECOD; PDBsum)
- AlphaFold: IPR013117; PF07979

Intimin is a virulence factor (adhesin) of EPEC (e.g. E. coli O127:H6) and EHEC (e.g. E. coli O157:H7) E. coli strains. It is an attaching and effacing (A/E) protein, which with other virulence factors is necessary and responsible for enteropathogenic and enterohaemorrhagic diarrhoea.

Intimin is expressed on the bacterial cell surface where it can bind to its receptor Tir (Translocated intimin receptor). Tir, and over 25 other bacterial proteins are secreted from attaching and effacing E. coli directly into the cytoplasm of intestinal epithelial cells by a Type three secretion system. Once within the cytoplasm of the host cell, Tir is inserted into the plasma membrane, allowing surface exposure and intimin binding. Tir-intimin interaction mediates tight binding of enteropathogenic and enterohaemorrhagic E.coli to the intestinal epithelia, resulting in the formation of effacing lesions on intestinal epithelia.

The structure of the C-terminal domain has been solved and shown to have a C-lectin type of structure. It is the C-terminal domain that mediates attachment to Tir.

It is a 94 kDa outer membrane protein encoded by eaeA gene in the locus of enterocyte effacement (LEE), a 35-Kb pathogenicity island. Mutations in the eaeA gene result in loss of ability to cause A/E lesions, and is required for full virulence in infected volunteers and animal models. The N-terminal domains of intimin from A/E lesion forming pathogens have high homology with each other and to invasin from Yersinia pseudotuberculosis and Yersinia enterocolitica, whereas the C-terminal domains show less homology.

Antibodies to intimin are present in:

1. Immune colostrum from mothers in EPEC endemic areas
2. The serum of EPEC/EHEC infected children and EPEC infected volunteers
3. Secretions of Citrobacter rodentium infected mice.
