= Shiga toxin =

Family of related toxins

Shiga-like toxin beta subunit

Identifiers
- Symbol: SLT_beta
- Pfam: PF02258
- InterPro: IPR003189
- SCOP2: 2bos / SCOPe / SUPFAM
- TCDB: 1.C.54
Available protein structures:
- PDB: IPR003189 PF02258 (ECOD; PDBsum)
- AlphaFold: IPR003189; PF02258

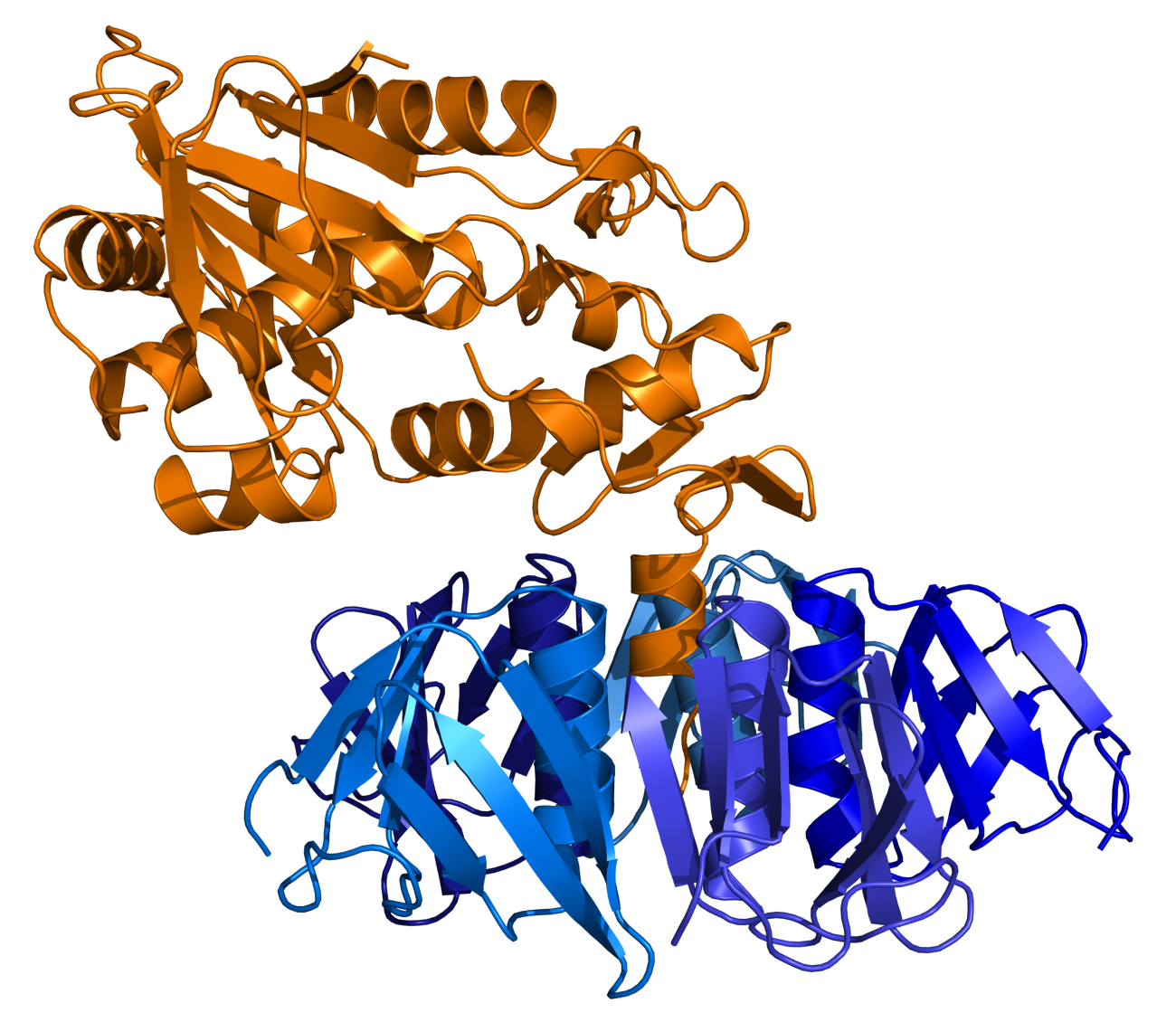
Ribbon diagram of Shiga toxin (Stx) from S. dysenteriae. From PDB: 1R4Q.

Shiga-like toxin subunit A

Identifiers
- Symbol: Shiga-like_toxin_subunit_A
- InterPro: IPR016331
- SCOP2: 1r4q / SCOPe / SUPFAM
Available protein structures:
- PDB: IPR016331
- AlphaFold: IPR016331

Shiga toxins are a family of related toxins with two major groups, Stx1 and Stx2, expressed by genes considered to be part of the genome of lambdoid prophages. The toxins are named after Kiyoshi Shiga, who first described the bacterial origin of dysentery caused by Shigella dysenteriae. Shiga-like toxin (SLT) is a historical term for similar or identical toxins produced by Escherichia coli. The most common sources for Shiga toxin are the bacteria S. dysenteriae and some serotypes of Escherichia coli (shigatoxigenic or STEC), which include serotypes O157:H7, and O104:H4.

== Nomenclature ==
Microbiologists use many terms to describe Shiga toxin and differentiate more than one unique form. Many of these terms are used interchangeably.

1. Shiga toxin type 1 and type 2 (Stx-1 and 2) are the Shiga toxins produced by some E. coli strains. Stx-1 is identical to Stx of Shigella spp. or differs by only one amino acid. Stx-2 shares 55% amino acid homology with Stx-1.
2. Cytotoxins – an archaic denotation for Stx – is used in a broad sense.
3. Verocytotoxins/verotoxins – a seldom-used term for Stx – is from the hypersensitivity of Vero cells to Stx.
4. The term Shiga-like toxins is another antiquated term which arose prior to the understanding that Shiga and Shiga-like toxins were identical.

== History ==
The toxin is named after Kiyoshi Shiga, who discovered S. dysenteriae in 1897. In 1977, researchers in Ottawa, Ontario discovered the Shiga toxin normally produced by Shigella dysenteriae in a line of E. coli. The E. coli version of the toxin was named "verotoxin" because of its ability to kill Vero cells (African green monkey kidney cells) in culture. Shortly after, the verotoxin was referred to as Shiga-like toxin because of its similarities to Shiga toxin.

It has been suggested by some researchers that the gene coding for Shiga-like toxin comes from a toxin-converting lambdoid bacteriophage, such as H-19B or 933W, inserted into the bacteria's chromosome via transduction. Phylogenetic studies of the diversity of E. coli suggest that it may have been relatively easy for Shiga toxin to transduce into certain strains of E. coli, because Shigella is itself a subgenus of Escherichia; in fact, some strains traditionally considered E. coli (including those that produce this toxin) in fact belong to this lineage. Being closer relatives of Shigella dysenteriae than of the typical E. coli, it is not at all unusual that toxins similar to that of S. dysenteriae are produced by these strains. As microbiology advances, the historical variation in nomenclature (which arose because of gradually advancing science in multiple places) is increasingly giving way to recognizing all of these molecules as "versions of the same toxin" rather than "different toxins".

== Transmission ==
Shiga toxin is usually taken in with contaminated food or water. The toxin requires highly specific receptors on the cells' surface in order to attach and enter the cell; species such as cattle, swine, and deer which do not carry these receptors may harbor toxigenic bacteria without any ill effect, shedding them in their feces, from where they may be spread to humans.

== Clinical significance ==
Symptoms of Shiga toxin ingestion include abdominal pain as well as watery diarrhea. Bloody diarrhea may be seen. Severe life-threatening cases are characterized by hemorrhagic colitis (HC).

The toxin is associated with hemolytic-uremic syndrome. In contrast, Shigella species may also produce shigella enterotoxins, which are the cause of dysentery.

The toxin is effective against small blood vessels, such as found in the digestive tract, the kidney, and lungs, but not against large vessels such as the arteries or major veins. A specific target for the toxin appears to be the vascular endothelium of the glomerulus. This is the filtering structure that is a key to the function of the kidney. Destroying these structures leads to kidney failure and the development of the often deadly and frequently debilitating hemolytic uremic syndrome. Food poisoning with Shiga toxin often also has effects on the lungs and the nervous system.

== Structure and mechanism ==
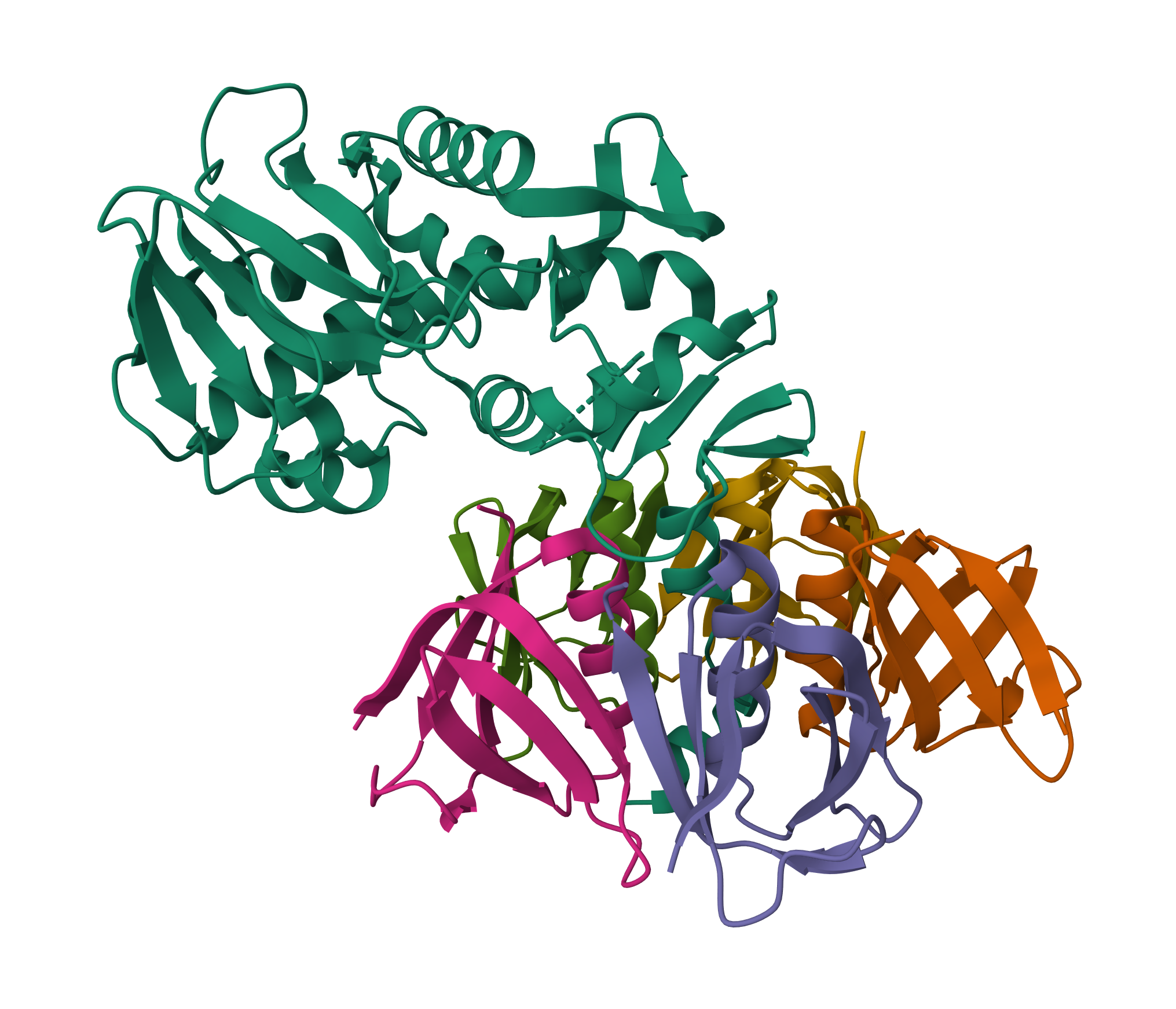
SLT2 from Escherichia coli O157:H7. A-subunit is shown above (viridian), with B-subunit pentamer below (multicolored). From PDB: 1R4P.

=== Mechanism ===
The B subunits of the toxin bind to a component of the cell membrane known as glycolipid globotriaosylceramide (Gb3). Binding of the subunit B to Gb3 causes induction of narrow tubular membrane invaginations, which drives formation of inward membrane tubules for toxin-receptor complex uptake into the cell. These tubules are essential for uptake into the host cell. The Shiga toxin (a non-pore forming toxin) is transferred to the cytosol via Golgi network and endoplasmic reticulum (ER). From the Golgi toxin is trafficked to the ER. It is then processed through cleavage by a furin-like protease to separate the A1 subunit. Some toxin-receptor complexes reportedly bypass these steps and are transported to the nucleus rather than the cytosol, with unknown effects.

Shiga toxins act to inhibit protein synthesis within target cells by a mechanism similar to that of the plant toxin ricin. After entering a cell via a macropinosome, the payload (A subunit) cleaves a specific adenine nucleobase from the 28S RNA of the 60S subunit of the ribosome, thereby halting protein synthesis. As they mainly act on the lining of the blood vessels, the vascular endothelium, a breakdown of the lining and hemorrhage eventually occurs.

The bacterial Shiga toxin can be used for targeted therapy of gastric cancer, because this tumor entity expresses the receptor of the Shiga toxin. For this purpose an unspecific chemotherapeutical is conjugated to the B-subunit to make it specific. In this way only the tumor cells, but not healthy cells, are destroyed during therapy.

=== Structure ===
The toxin has two subunits—designated A (mol. wt. 32000 Da) and B (mol. wt. 7700 Da)—and is one of the AB_{5} toxins. The B subunit is a pentamer that binds to specific glycolipids on the host cell, specifically globotriaosylceramide (Gb3). Following this, the A subunit is internalised and cleaved into two parts. The A1 component then binds to the ribosome, disrupting protein synthesis. Stx-2 has been found to be about 400 times more toxic (as quantified by LD_{50} in mice) than Stx-1.

Gb3 is, for unknown reasons, present in greater amounts in renal epithelial tissues, to which the renal toxicity of Shiga toxin may be attributed. Gb3 is also found in central nervous system neurons and endothelium, which may lead to neurotoxicity. Stx-2 is also known to increase the expression of its receptor GB3 and cause neuronal dysfunctions.

== See also ==
- 2011 German E. coli outbreak
- Cholera toxin
- Enterotoxin
- Pertussis toxin
