= Shigatoxigenic and verotoxigenic Escherichia coli =

Strains of bacteria

Shigatoxigenic and verotoxigenic E. coli
- Specialty: Infectious disease

Shigatoxigenic Escherichia coli (STEC) and verotoxigenic E. coli (VTEC) are strains of the bacterium Escherichia coli that produce Shiga toxin (also called verotoxin). (Note: Current classifications consider the two identical, and only use the "Shiga toxin" name. See § Names.) Some strains cause illness in humans; those that do are collectively known as enterohemorrhagic E. coli (EHEC), and are major causes of foodborne illness. When infecting the large intestine of humans, EHECs often cause gastroenteritis, enterocolitis, and bloody diarrhea (hence the name "enterohemorrhagic"), and sometimes cause a severe complication called hemolytic-uremic syndrome (HUS).

Cattle are an important natural reservoir for EHEC, since adult ruminants colonized with the bacteria are asymptomatic (this is because they lack vascular expression of the target receptor for Shiga toxins). The group and its subgroups are known by various names. They are distinguished from other strains of intestinal pathogenic E. coli, including enterotoxigenic E. coli (ETEC), enteropathogenic E. coli (EPEC), enteroinvasive E. coli (EIEC), enteroaggregative E. coli (EAEC), and diffusely adherent E. coli (DAEC).

== Background and incidence ==
Shiga toxin–producing Escherichia coli are zoonotic pathogens. They can be found in the gastrointestinal tract of cattle and sheep, and can infect humans. They are globally-occurring bacteria. The first recorded outbreaks occurred in 1983.

The most common and well-known serogroup associated with diarrhea and HUS in the United States is E. coli O157:H7, however non-O157 STEC serogroups are now surpassing the number of O157 STEC infections, with up to 52% of all STEC associated disease due to non-O157 STEC. One estimate suggests this corresponds to more than 37,000 illnesses annually in the US; of these, over 1,000 lead to hospitalization per year, and at least 30 deaths in the United States annually.

The CDC reports that STEC O157 cause an estimated 97,000 illnesses, 3,270 hospitalizations, and 30 deaths, annually, and STEC non-O157 cause an estimated 169,000 illnesses and 400 hospitalizations. It also suggests that EPEC and EIEC infections are most common among young children, while EAEC infections are most common among persons who are immunocompromised.

Globally, it is estimated that Shigatoxigenic Escherichia coli causes 2,801,000 acute illnesses, 3890 cases of HUS, 270 cases of permanent ESRD, and 230 deaths annually.

Microbiologists recognize a set of "Big Six" strains: E. coli O26; E. coli O45; E. coli O103; E. coli O111; E. coli O121; and E. coli O145.

Both E. coli O145 and E. coli O104 serotypes can cause hemolytic-uremic syndrome (HUS); the E. coli O104 strain is shown to account for 2% to 51% of known HUS cases; an estimated 56% of such cases are caused by O145; and around 14% of HUS cases are caused by other EHEC strains.

The 2011 E. coli O104:H4 outbreak in Germany was due to Shigatoxigenic E. coli O104:H4, a strain with both enteroaggregative and enterohemorrhagic properties.

== Clinical presentation ==
The clinical presentation in humans ranges from a mild and uncomplicated diarrhea to a hemorrhagic colitis with severe abdominal pain. Serotype O157:H7 may trigger an infectious dose with 100 bacterial cells or fewer; other strain such as 104:H4 has also caused an outbreak in Germany 2011. Infections are most common in warmer months and in children under five years of age and are usually acquired from uncooked beef and unpasteurized milk and juice. Initially a non-bloody diarrhea develops in patients after the bacterium attaches to the epithelium of the terminal ileum, cecum, and colon. The subsequent production of toxins mediates the bloody diarrhea. In children, a complication can be hemolytic uremic syndrome which then causes cytotoxins to attack the cells in the gut, so that bacteria can leak out into the blood and cause endothelial injury in locations such as the kidney by binding to globotriaosylceramide (Gb3). EHECs that induce bloody diarrhea lead to HUS in 10% of cases. The clinical manifestations of postdiarrheal HUS include acute renal failure, microangiopathic hemolytic anemia, and thrombocytopenia. The verocytotoxin (shiga-like toxin) can directly damage renal and endothelial cells. Thrombocytopenia occurs as platelets are consumed by clotting. Hemolytic anemia results from intravascular fibrin deposition, increased fragility of red blood cells, and fragmentation.

Antibiotics are of questionable value and have not shown to be of clear clinical benefit. Antibiotics that interfere with DNA synthesis, such as fluoroquinolones, have been shown to induce the Stx-bearing bacteriophage and cause increased production of toxins. Attempts to block toxin production with antibacterials which target the ribosomal protein synthesis are conceptually more attractive. Plasmapheresis offers a controversial but possibly helpful treatment. The use of antimotility agents (medications that suppress diarrhea by slowing bowel transit) in children under 10 years of age or in elderly patients should be avoided, as they increase the risk of HUS with EHEC infections.

== Names ==
Names of the group and its subgroups include the following. There is some polysemy involved. Invariable synonymity is indicated by having the same color. Beyond that there is also some wider but variable synonymity. The first two (purple) in their narrowest sense are generally treated as hypernyms of the others (red and blue), although in less precise usage the red and blue have often been treated as synonyms of the purple. At least one reference holds "EHEC" to be mutually exclusive of "VTEC" and "STEC", but this does not match common usage, as many more publications lump all of the latter in with the former.

The current microbiology-based view on "Shiga-like toxin" (SLT) or "verotoxin" is that they should all be referred to as (versions of) Shiga toxin, as the difference is negligible. Following this view, all "VTEC" (blue) should be called "STEC" (red). Historically, a different name was sometimes used because the toxins are not exactly the same as the one found in Shigella dysenteriae, down to every last amino acid residue, although by this logic every "STEC" would be a "VTEC". The line can also be drawn to use "STEC" for Stx1-producing strains and "VTEC" for Stx2-producing strains, since Stx1 is closer to the Shiga toxin. Practically, the choice of words and categories is not as important as the understanding of clinical relevance.

| Name | Short form |
|---|---|
| enterohemorrhagic E. coli | EHEC |
| hemolytic uremic syndrome–associated enterohemorrhagic E. coli | HUSEC |
| shiga toxin–producing E. coli | STEC |
| shigatoxigenic E. coli | STEC |
| shiga-like toxin–producing E. coli | SLTEC |
| verotoxin-producing E. coli | VTEC |
| verotoxigenic E. coli | VTEC |
| verocytotoxin-producing E. coli | VTEC |
| verocytotoxigenic E. coli | VTEC |

== Infectivity and virulence ==
The infectivity or the virulence of an EHEC strain depends on several factors, including the presence of fucose in the medium, the sensing of this sugar and the activation of EHEC pathogenicity island.

=== Attaching and effacing ===
To successfully colonize the gut of its host, EHEC relies on attaching itself to epithelial cells in the large intestine. A type III secretion system (T3SS) consisting of intimin and its translocated intimin receptor (Tir), is expressed on the cell membrane, allowing EHEC to intimately attach to host cells. T3SS secretes Tir into the host cell membrane and induces the formation of actin pedestals, resulting in attachment and effacing lesions on epithelial cells. Expression of T3SS associated genes is regulated by Locus of enterocyte effacement (LEE), and is activated through the EvgSA two component system in the presence of nicotinamide.

=== Shiga toxins ===
Shiga toxins are a major virulence factor of EHEC. The toxins interact with intestinal epithelium and can cause systematic complications in humans like HUS and cerebral dysfunction if they enter the circulation. In EHEC, Shiga toxins are encoded by lysogenic bacteriophages. The toxins bind to cell-surface glycolipid receptor Gb3, which causes the cell to take the toxin in via endocytosis. The Shiga toxins target ribosomal RNA, which inhibits protein synthesis and causes apoptosis. The reason EHEC are symptomless in cattle is because the cattle do not have vascular expression of Gb3 unlike humans. Thus, the Shiga toxins cannot pass through the intestinal epithelium into circulation.

=== Regulation of the pathogenicity island ===
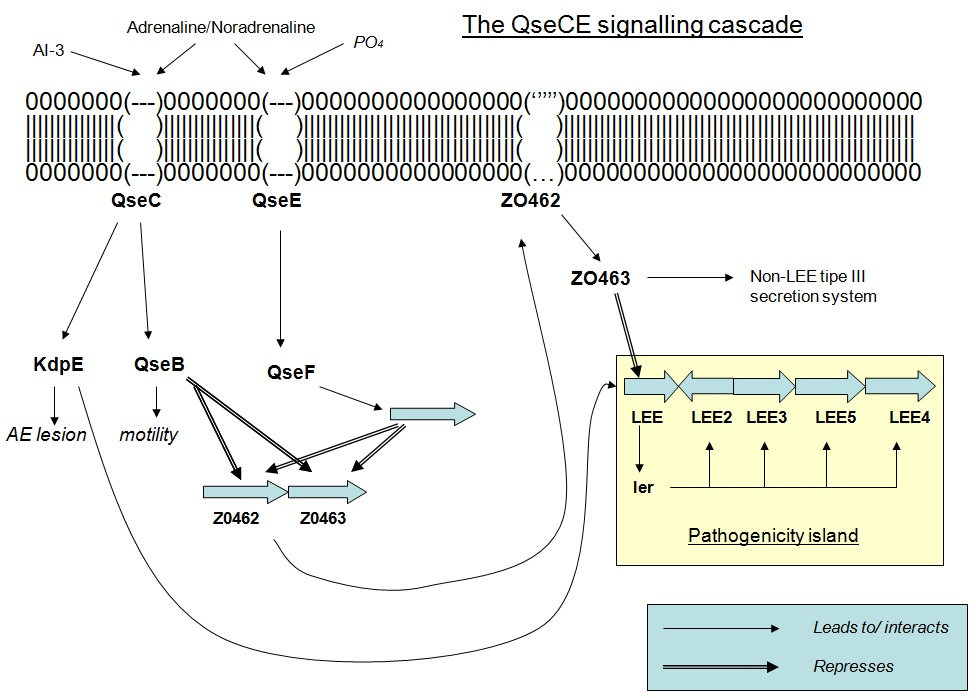
Scheme of the signalling cascade in EHEC with effect of the sensing of some signalling molecules in the virulence of eneterohaemorragic E. coli

EHEC becomes pathogenic through the expression of the locus of enterocyte effacement (LEE) encoded on its pathogenicity island. However, when EHEC is not in a host this expression is a waste of energy and resources, so it is only activated if some molecules are sensed in the environment.

When QseC or QseE bind with one of their interacting signalling molecule, they autophosphorylate and transfer its phosphate to the response regulator. QseC senses adrenaline, noradrenaline, and an Endonuclease I-SceIII, encoded by a mobile group I intron within the mitochondrial COX1 gene (AI3); whereas QseE senses adrenaline, noradrenaline, SO4 and PO4. These signals are a clear indication to the bacteria that they are no longer free in the environment, but in the gut.

As a result, QseC phosphorylates QseB (which activates flagella), KpdE (which activates the LEE) and QseF. QseE phosphorylates QseF. The products QseBC and QseEF repress the expression of FusK and FusR. FusK and FusR are the two components of a system to repress the transcription of the LEE genes. FusK is a sensor kinase which is able to sense many sugars among which fucose. When fucose is present in the medium FusK phosphorylates FusR which represses LEE expression.

Thus when EHEC enters the gut there is a competition between the signals coming from QseC and QseF, and the signal coming from FusK. The first two would like to activate virulence, but Fusk stops it because the mucous layer, which is a source of fucose, isolates enterocytes from bacteria making the synthesis of the virulence factors useless. However, when fucose concentration decreases because bacterial cells find an unprotected area of the epithelium, then the expression of LEE genes will not be repressed by FusR, and KpdE will strongly activate them. In summary, the combined effect of the QseC/QseF and FusKR provide a fine-tuning system of LEE expression which saves energy and allow the mechanisms of virulence to be expressed only when the chances of success are higher. There are rare STEC without LEE.

== See also ==
- Fucose
- Gut flora
- Mucin
- Virulence
- Hemolytic–uremic syndrome
- Immune thrombocytopenic purpura
