= Enterotoxigenic Escherichia coli =

- Specialty: Infectious disease

Enterotoxigenic Escherichia coli (ETEC) is a pathotype of Escherichia coli that produces enterotoxins (heat-labile and/or heat-stable) and colonizes the small intestine; it is a major bacterial cause of diarrhoea in low- and middle-income countries and a leading cause of travellers' diarrhoea. Estimates of global burden vary by source: WHO reports about 220 million ETEC diarrhoea episodes per year and pathogen-specific under-5 mortality estimates of roughly 18,700–42,000 depending on the model, while earlier GBD modelling (2010) produced a higher mortality estimate (~157,000 deaths annually). The organism was first described in the late 1960s by R. Bradley Sack and colleagues following studies in South Asia.

== Signs and symptoms ==
Infection with ETEC can cause profuse, watery diarrhea with no blood or leukocytes and abdominal cramping. Fever, nausea with or without vomiting, chills, loss of appetite, headache, muscle aches and bloating can also occur, but are less common.

== Pathogenic factors ==
=== Attachment ===
ETEC use fimbrial colonization factor (CF) or coli surface (CS) antigens to attach to enterocytes in the upper small intestine. There are several types of CF antigens; the same is true of CS.

=== Enterotoxins ===
ETEC send toxins into target cells after successful attachment. Enterotoxins produced by ETEC include heat-labile enterotoxin (LT) and heat-stable enterotoxin (ST).

== Prevention ==
To date, no licensed vaccines specifically target ETEC, though several are in various stages of development. Studies indicate that protective immunity to ETEC develops after natural or experimental infection, suggesting that vaccine-induced ETEC immunity should be feasible and could be an effective preventive strategy. Prevention through vaccination is a critical part of the strategy to reduce the incidence and severity of diarrheal disease due to ETEC, particularly among children in low-resource settings. The development of a vaccine against this infection has been hampered by technical constraints, insufficient support for coordination, and a lack of market forces for research and development. Most vaccine development efforts are taking place in the public sector or as research programs within biotechnology companies. The World Health Organization has identified ETEC as a priority target for vaccine development and has published Preferred Product Characteristics to guide development efforts.”

== Management ==
Treatment for ETEC infection includes rehydration therapy and antibiotics, although ETEC is frequently resistant to common antibiotics. Improved sanitation is also key. Since the transmission of this bacterium is fecal contamination of food and water supplies, one way to prevent infection is by improving public and private health facilities. Another simple prevention of infection is by drinking factory bottled water—this is especially important for travelers and traveling military—though it may not be feasible in developing countries, which carry the greatest disease burden.

== See also ==
- Gastroenteritis
