= Escherichia coli O157:H7 =

Serotype of the bacteria Escherichia coli

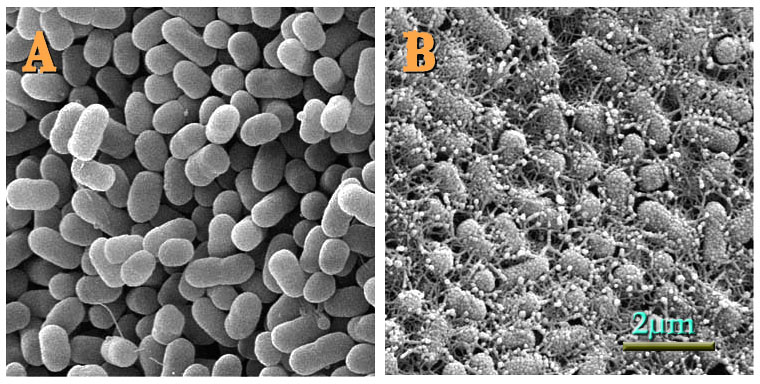
- Topographical images of colonies of E. coli O157:H7 strains (A) 43895OW (curli non-producing) and (B) 43895OR (curli producing) grown on agar for 48 h at 28°C
- Specialty: Infectious disease

Escherichia coli O157:H7 is a serotype of the bacterial species Escherichia coli and one of the Shiga-like toxin–producing types of E. coli. It is a cause of disease, typically foodborne illness, through consumption of contaminated or raw food, including raw milk and undercooked ground beef. Infection with this type of pathogenic bacteria may lead to hemorrhagic diarrhea or kidney failure; these have been reported to cause the deaths of children younger than five years of age, of elderly patients, and of patients whose immune systems are otherwise compromised.

Transmission is via the fecal–oral route, and most illness has been through distribution of contaminated raw leaf green vegetables, undercooked meat and raw milk.

== Signs and symptoms ==
E. coli O157:H7 infection often causes severe, acute hemorrhagic diarrhea (although nonhemorrhagic diarrhea is also possible) and abdominal cramps. Usually little or no fever is present, and the illness resolves in 5 to 10 days. It can also sometimes be asymptomatic.

In certain populations, including young children (especially those under five years of age), older adults, and individuals with compromised immune systems, the infection may lead to hemolytic–uremic syndrome (HUS), a condition characterized by the destruction of red blood cells and acute kidney failure. Approximately 2–7% of infections progress to this complication. In the United States, HUS is the leading cause of acute kidney failure in children, and most cases are associated with infection by Escherichia coli O157:H7.

== Bacteriology ==
E. coli O157:H7

Like the other strains of the 1x E. coli, O157:H7 is gram-negative and oxidase-negative. Unlike many other strains, it does not ferment sorbitol, which provides a basis for clinical laboratory differentiation of the strain. Strains of E. coli that express Shiga and Shiga-like toxins gained that ability via infection with a prophage containing the structural gene coding for the toxin, and nonproducing strains may become infected and produce shiga-like toxins after incubation with shiga toxin positive strains. The prophage responsible seems to have infected the strain's ancestors fairly recently, as viral particles have been observed to replicate in the host if it is stressed in some way (e.g. antibiotics).

All clinical isolates of E. coli O157:H7 possess the plasmid pO157. The periplasmic catalase is encoded on pO157 and may enhance the bacterium's virulence by providing additional oxidative protection when infecting the host. E. coli O157:H7 non-hemorrhagic strains become hemorrhagic strains by lysogenic conversion after bacteriophage infection of non-hemorrhagic cells.

=== Natural habitat ===
While it is relatively uncommon, the E. coli serotype O157:H7 is found in the intestinal contents of some cattle, goats, and sheep. Cows' digestive tracts lack the Shiga toxin receptor globotriaosylceramide, and thus can be asymptomatic carriers of the bacterium. The prevalence of E. coli O157:H7 in North American feedlot cattle herds ranges from 0 to 60%. Some cattle may also be so-called "super-shedders" of the bacterium. Super-shedders may be defined as cattle exhibiting rectoanal junction colonization and excreting >10^{3 to 4} CFU g^{−1} feces. Super-shedders have been found to constitute a small proportion of the cattle in a feedlot (<10%), but may account for >90% of all E. coli O157:H7 excreted.

== Transmission ==
Infection with E. coli O157:H7 can come from ingestion of contaminated food or water, or oral contact with contaminated surfaces. Examples include undercooked ground beef, leafy vegetables, and raw milk. Fields often become contaminated with the bacterium through irrigation processes or contaminated water naturally entering the soil. It is highly virulent, with a low infectious dose: an inoculation of fewer than 10 to 100 colony-forming units (CFU) of E. coli O157:H7 is sufficient to cause infection, compared to over a million CFU for other pathogenic E. coli strains.

== Diagnosis ==
A stool culture can detect the bacterium. The sample is cultured on sorbitol-MacConkey (SMAC) agar, or the variant cefixime potassium tellurite sorbitol-MacConkey agar (CT-SMAC). On SMAC agar, O157:H7 colonies appear clear due to their inability to ferment sorbitol, while the colonies of the usual sorbitol-fermenting serotypes of E. coli appear red. Sorbitol non-fermenting colonies are tested for the somatic O157 antigen before being confirmed as E. coli O157:H7. Like all cultures, diagnosis is time-consuming with this method; swifter diagnosis is possible using quick E. coli DNA extraction method plus polymerase chain reaction techniques. Newer technologies using fluorescent and antibody detection are also under development.

== Prevention ==
Avoiding consumption of, or contact with, unpasteurized dairy products, undercooked beef, uncleaned vegetables, and non-disinfected water reduces the risk of an E. coli infection. Proper hand washing with water that has been treated with adequate levels of chlorine or other effective disinfectants after using the lavatory or changing a diaper, especially among children or those with diarrhea, reduces the risk of transmission.

E. coli O157:H7 infection is a nationally reportable disease in the US, Great Britain, and Germany. It is also reportable in most states of Australia including Queensland.

== Treatment ==
While fluid replacement and blood pressure support may be necessary to prevent death from dehydration, most patients recover without treatment in 5–10 days. There is no evidence that antibiotics improve the course of disease, and treatment with antibiotics may precipitate hemolytic–uremic syndrome (HUS). The antibiotics are thought to trigger prophage induction, and the prophages released by the dying bacteria infect other susceptible bacteria, converting them into toxin-producing forms. Antidiarrheal agents, such as loperamide (Imodium), should also be avoided, as they may prolong the infection.

Certain novel treatments, such as anti-induction strategies to prevent toxin production and the use of anti-Shiga toxin antibodies, have also been proposed.

== History ==
The common ancestor of Escherichia coli O157:H7 was found to have originated in the Netherlands around 1890 as estimated by molecular biologists. It is thought that international spread was through animal movements, like Holstein Friesian cattle. E.coli O157:H7 is thought to have moved from Europe to Australia around 1937, to the United States in 1941, to Canada in 1960, and from Australia to New Zealand in 1966.

The first recorded observation of human E. coli O157:H7 infection was in 1975, in association with a sporadic case of hemorrhagic colitis, but it was not identified as pathogenic then. It was first recognized as a human pathogen following a 1982 hemorrhagic colitis outbreak in Oregon and Michigan, in which at least 47 people were sickened by eating beef hamburger patties from a fast food chain that were found to be contaminated with it.

The United States Department of Agriculture banned the sale of ground beef contaminated with the O157:H7 strain in 1994.

== Culture and society ==
The pathogen results in an estimated 2,100 hospitalizations annually in the United States. The illness is often misdiagnosed, so expensive and invasive diagnostic procedures may be performed. Patients who develop HUS often require prolonged hospitalization, dialysis, and long-term followup.

== See also ==
- 1993 Jack in the Box E. coli outbreak
- 1996 Odwalla E. coli outbreak
- 1996 Wishaw E. coli outbreak
- 2011 Germany E. coli O104:H4 outbreak
- 2024 McDonald's E. coli outbreak
- Escherichia coli O104:H4
- Escherichia coli O121
- Food-induced purpura
- List of foodborne illness outbreaks
- Walkerton E. coli outbreak
