= List of foodborne illness outbreaks in the United States =

In 1999, an estimated 5,000 deaths, 325,000 hospitalizations and 76 million illnesses were caused by foodborne illnesses within the United States. The Centers for Disease Control and Prevention began tracking outbreaks starting in the 1970s. By 2012, the figures were roughly 130,000 hospitalizations and 3,000 deaths.

== 1850s ==
- The swill milk scandal leads to the deaths of 8,000 babies in one year alone.

== 1919 ==
- 35 people died in 1919 from botulism from improperly canned black olives produced in California.

== 1967 ==
- Two women died in 1967 from botulism from canned tuna fish from the Washington Packing Corporation.

== 1970s ==
=== 1971 ===
- 1971 Bon Vivant botulism incident - 2 cases of botulism occurred in New York. 6,444 vichyssoise soup cans were recalled, including all Bon Vivant soups – more than a million cans in all. Out of 324 soup cans, five were contaminated. The company filed for bankruptcy and changed its business name to Moore & Co. The remaining products were planned for removal in 1974.

=== 1974 ===
- Salmonella in unpasteurized apple cider caused 200 illnesses in New Jersey.

=== 1977 ===
- Botulism in peppers served at the Trini and Carmen restaurant in Pontiac, Michigan, caused the largest outbreak of botulism poisonings in the United States up to that time. The peppers were canned at home by a former employee. Fifty-nine people were sickened.

=== 1978 ===
- Botulism in Clovis, New Mexico. 34 people who ate at a restaurant, Colonial Park Country Club, developed clinical botulism in the second-largest outbreak in United States history. The outbreak was traced to either potato salad or a commercially prepared three-bean salad served to a group attending a banquet. Despite a thorough search of the local landfill, the discarded three-bean salad containers were never located, making it impossible to test them to confirm the source of contamination. All patients were hospitalized and 33 received trivalent botulinal antitoxin. There were two deaths.

== 1980s ==
=== 1983 ===
- Botulism (Type A Clostridium botulinum) in Peoria, Illinois. 28 persons were hospitalized, and 20 patients were treated with an antitoxin. 12 patients required ventilatory support and 1 death resulted. The source was sautéed onions made from fresh raw onions served on a patty melt sandwich. The sandwiches were served at the Skewer Inn Restaurant located inside Northwoods Mall.

=== 1984/85 ===
- Hamburger thyrotoxicosis (alimentary thyrotoxicosis) outbreak among residents of southwestern Minnesota and adjacent areas of South Dakota and Iowa.

=== 1985 ===
- A Listeria outbreak in California stemmed from Mexican style soft cheese made by Jalisco. There were 52 confirmed deaths, including 19 stillbirths and 10 infant deaths. At the time, it was the deadliest foodborne illness outbreak in the United States, measured by the number of deaths, since the Centers for Disease Control and Prevention had begun tracking outbreaks in the 1970s. Alta Dena supplied the raw milk to Jalisco to make the cheese. Jalisco had a non-licensed technician perform the pasteurization, though pasteurized milk might have been diluted with non-pasteurized milk by the technician. On July 15, 1989, Alta Dena was absolved of any blame.
- As there was Salmonella serovar Typhimurium in milk from the Hillfarm Dairy in Melrose Park, Illinois, a salmonellosis outbreak occurred. At least 16,284 people were infected, all but 1,059 of them from Illinois. The others were in Indiana, Iowa, Michigan, Minnesota and Wisconsin. Two people died and the infection was a contributing factor in the deaths of "four, possibly five, others". It was the worst outbreak of salmonellosis food poisoning in United States history at the time.

== 1990s ==
=== 1992 ===
- Botulism in whitefish in New Jersey. Four members of a Fort Lee family were stricken with botulism after eating fish bought in Jersey City.

=== 1993 ===
- 1992–1993 Jack in the Box E. coli outbreak: An E. coli O157:H7 outbreak caused by undercooked hamburgers from Jack in the Box. Four children died and nearly 700 others became sick in the Seattle area and other parts of the Pacific Northwest. The outrage resulting from the deaths placed strong political pressure on Washington and resulted in new regulations from the USDA to reform century-old practices in the meat industry. The new regulations, titled Pathogen Reduction and Hazard Analysis and Critical Control Point Systems Final Rule, required a mandatory HACCP inspection system and microbial testing in meat processing plants.

=== 1994 ===
- Botulism in El Paso, Texas. A Greek restaurant made dips from improperly stored foil-wrapped baked potatoes. Thirty people affected; 4 required mechanical ventilation.
- Salmonella in ice cream from Schwan's Sales Enterprises of Marshall, Minnesota. Based upon the volume of ice cream produced, the number of consumers, and the attack rate amongst consumers, it is estimated that 29,100 people in Minnesota suffered from Salmonella serovar Enteritidis gastroenteritis after eating Schwan's ice cream; and that since most of the ice cream produced during the outbreak was distributed outside Minnesota, as many as 224,000 people across the United States became sick. The contamination occurred when raw, unpasteurized eggs were hauled in a tanker truck that later carried pasteurized ice cream to the Schwan's plant. The ice cream premix was not re-pasteurized after delivery to the plant.

=== 1996 ===
- E. coli O157:H7 in unpasteurized apple juice from Odwalla. The company was using blemished fruit and ignored warnings from in-house safety experts and specialized in selling unpasteurized juices for their supposed health benefits. 70 people in several U.S. states were stricken, mostly in the West, and in Canada. The outbreak caused one death, a 16-month-old girl from Colorado.
- E. coli O157:H7 in lettuce sickened at least 61 people in Illinois, Connecticut and New York in May and June 1996.

=== 1997 ===
- Hepatitis A on frozen strawberries from Andrew & Williamson Sales Co. of San Diego, California. The strawberries were grown in Baja California, Mexico and processed by A&W. Thousands of students from Arizona, California, Georgia, Iowa, Michigan, and Tennessee may have been exposed to the virus from eating strawberries in school lunches. Over 2.6 million pounds of strawberries were recalled.

=== 1998 ===
- A listeriosis outbreak, which was the third deadliest outbreak of foodborne illness in the United States since the Centers for Disease Control and Prevention started tracking in the 1970s, resulted in 14 deaths and 4 miscarriages or stillbirths. The listeria outbreak was in hot dogs and cold cuts from Sara Lee Corporation. Some sources put the death toll as high as 21.

=== 1999 ===
- A Sun Orchard salmonellosis outbreak occurred when more than 400 people became infected with Salmonella serovar Muenchen as a result of drinking contaminated unpasteurized orange juice. The juice was produced by Sun Orchard, based in Tempe, Arizona, and sold to restaurants, hotels, retail and catering outlets in 15 US states and 2 Canadian provinces under a variety of different brand names, including Sun Orchard, Earls, Joey Tomato's, Trader Joe's, Markon, Aloha, Sysco, and Voila! The outbreak resulted in 1 fatality, and is the largest outbreak of salmonellosis associated with unpasteurized juice.
- E. coli O157:H7 was found in the drinking water at the Washington County Fair in Easton, New York. Over 700 people were affected and 2 people died.

== 2000s ==
=== 2000 ===
- Salmonella in bean sprouts from Pacific Coast Sprout Farms. They bought dry seeds in China and Australia and when germinated, the sprouts caused an outbreak from Oregon to Massachusetts. At least 67 people became ill, and 17 were hospitalized.
- A young girl died and 65 other people were sickened in an E. coli O157:H7 outbreak in Milwaukee, Wisconsin. The source of the outbreak was two Sizzler restaurants that apparently allowed raw meat to come into contact with other food items. The infected meat was traced to the Excel meat packing plant in Colorado.
- There were 19 confirmed cases, 19 likely cases, and 49 suspected cases of E. coli O157:H7 in Oregon in August. The cases were linked to a Wendy's restaurant, and although beef was the suspected vector of transmission, such a link was not conclusively shown.

=== 2002 ===
- E. coli O157:H7 in ground beef from ConAgra. 19 people became ill in California, Colorado, Michigan, South Dakota, Washington and Wyoming as a result of eating tainted hamburger from a ConAgra plant in Greeley, Colorado. The company recalled over 19 million pounds of ground beef it had manufactured, in the third largest recall in history.
- Listeria in processed turkey from Pilgrim's Pride. The company recalled over 27 million pounds of poultry products it had manufactured, in the largest recall in history. The outbreak killed 7 people, sickened 46, and caused 3 miscarriages.
- Botulism sickened 8 people in Western Alaska as a result of eating a beached beluga whale.
- Fifty-seven people in 7 states became ill in August and September after consuming meat contaminated with E. coli O157:H7. The tainted meat originated at the meat packing plant Emmpak Foods. Emmpak recalled 2.8 million pounds of ground beef in the aftermath of the outbreak.

=== 2003 ===
- In September and October 2003, a hepatitis A outbreak sickened around 210 people and was linked to contaminated green onions distributed through Atlanta State Farmers' Market.
- A hepatitis A outbreak from a Chi-Chi's restaurant was one of the most widespread hepatitis A outbreaks in the United States, afflicting at least 640 people, killing four people in north-eastern Ohio and south-western Pennsylvania in late 2003. The outbreak was blamed on tainted green onions at a Chi-Chi's restaurant in Monaca, Pennsylvania.

=== 2006 ===
- E. coli O157:H7 from Taco Bell in South Plainfield, New Jersey and Long Island. 39 people in central New Jersey and on Long Island were sickened and suffered from hemolytic uremic syndrome. Centers for Disease Control and Prevention at first believed the E. coli O157:H7 to be in the green onions. The FDA on December 13, 2006, said it could not confirm that scallions were the cause of the problem, as previously suspected, and that it was not ruling out any food as a possible culprit. It was later suspected that infected lettuce was the cause.
- 2006 North American E. coli outbreak. E. coli O157:H7 in bagged organic spinach packaged by Natural Selection Foods and most likely supplied by Earthbound Farm in San Juan Bautista. 3 dead, and 198 people reported sickened by the outbreak across 25 U.S. states, and 1 person reported sickened by the outbreak in Ontario.

=== 2007 ===
- On December 27, the Massachusetts Department of Public Health warned not to drink milk or milk-related products from Whittier Farms in Shrewsbury, MA due to a Listeria contamination that resulted in two deaths.
- On October 11, food manufacturer ConAgra asked stores to pull its Banquet and generic brand chicken and turkey pot pies due to 152 cases of salmonellosis in 31 states being linked to the consumption of ConAgra pot pies, with 20 people hospitalized. By October 12, a full recall was announced, affecting all varieties of frozen pot pies sold under the brands Banquet, Albertson's, Food Lion, Great Value, Hill Country Fare, Kirkwood, Kroger, Meijer, and Western Family. The recalled pot pies included all varieties in 7 oz (200 g) single-serving packages bearing the number P-9 or "Est. 1059" printed on the side of the package.
- E. coli O157:H7 in ground beef from the Topps Meat Company in Elizabeth, New Jersey. As of 2007, it is the second-largest beef recall in United States history.
- Botulism from cans of Castleberry's, Austex and Kroger brands of chili sauce. In total, over 25 different brands of a variety of products were recalled by Castleberry's Food Company. The best by dates for the affected products range from April 30, 2009, through May 22, 2009. The contamination by the toxin is extremely rare for commercially canned products. CDC medical epidemiologist Dr. Michael Lynch said the last such U.S. case dates to the 1970s. The roughly 25 cases reported each year were mainly from home canned foods.
- Salmonella from Peter Pan and Great Value Peanut Butter (both manufactured by ConAgra) in 44 states. By March 7, 2007, the outbreak had grown to 425 cases in 44 states since its start in August 2006. The CDC said it is believed to be the first Salmonella outbreak associated with peanut butter in United States history.
- In April and May, 14 people in 11 states were sickened after eating E. coli O157:H7-tainted beef packed by United Food Group. The meat packing company ultimately recalled 5.7 million pounds of potentially contaminated meat.

=== 2008 ===
- 2008 United States salmonellosis outbreak. As of 28 August 2008, from April 10, 2008, Salmonella serovar Saintpaul caused at least 1442 cases of salmonellosis in 43 states throughout the United States and Canada. As of July 2008, the U.S. Food and Drug Administration suspects that the contaminated food product is a common ingredient in fresh salsa, such as raw tomato, fresh jalapeño pepper, fresh serrano pepper, and fresh cilantro. It is the largest reported salmonellosis outbreak in the United States since 1985. During a House subcommittee hearing into food supply safety and the recent Salmonella contamination, a top federal official told panel members that agencies have found the source of the contamination after it showed up in yet another batch of Mexican-grown peppers. Adam Acheson, Food and Drug Administration associate commissioner for foods, said the FDA tracked the Salmonella-positive test to serrano peppers and irrigation water at a packing facility in Nuevo León, Mexico, and a grower in Tamaulipas. New Mexico and Texas were proportionally the hardest hit by far, with 49.7 and 16.1 reported cases per million, respectively. The greatest number of reported cases have occurred in Texas (384 reported cases), New Mexico (98), Illinois (100), and Arizona (49). There have been at least 203 reported hospitalizations linked to the outbreak, it has caused at least one death, and it may have been a contributing factor in at least one additional death. The Centers for Disease Control and Prevention (CDC) maintains that "it is likely many more illnesses have occurred than those reported." If applying a previous CDC estimated ratio of non-reported salmonellosis cases to reported cases (38.6:1), one would arrive at an estimated 40,273 illnesses from this outbreak.

=== 2009 ===
- Salmonella serovar Newport was found in beef products made by a Fresno, California-based unit of Cargill (Beef Packers Inc.) in August 2009, resulting in a large recall.
- Salmonellosis in peanut butter from Peanut Corporation of America in Blakely, Georgia has become "one of the nation’s worst known outbreaks of food-borne disease" in recent years. Nine are believed to have died and an estimated 22,500 were sickened. Criminal negligence was alleged after product tested positive then re-tested "negative" by a second testing agency, and shipped on several occasions. The product was in turn used by dozens of other manufacturers in hundreds of other products which have had to be recalled. The CEO of Peanut Corporation of America was sentenced to 28 years in prison for his role in the outbreak.
- E. coli O157:H7 was believed to have contaminated Nestlé Toll House refrigerated cookie dough. Nestlé recalled its products after the FDA reported there was a possibility that the E. coli O157:H7 outbreak, which sickened at least 66 people in 28 states, might be a result of raw cookie dough consumption. According to Marler Clark, the number of illnesses reached 70 in 30 states by June 23, 2009, with 35 hospitalizations required, and seven cases of hemolytic-uremic syndrome. The products which were originally believed to have been tainted came from a Danville, Virginia, plant. However, no E. coli O157:H7 has been found in the plant, according to the FDA. Many media sources have failed to report that E. coli contamination has not been confirmed in Nestlé products. The CDC has reported that ground beef is not a likely source of contamination.

== 2010s ==
=== 2010 ===
- In July 2010, the CDC identified a significant increase in the number of reported Salmonella serovar Enteritidis infections. Nearly 2,000 illnesses were reported between May and July, approximately 1,300 more than would normally be expected. The outbreak was connected to two Iowa egg producers, Wright County Egg and Hillandale Farms, that distributed eggs in 14 U.S. states. Both companies had connections to Quality Egg LLC, owned by Jack DeCoster and run by his son Peter DeCoster. In August 2010, Wright County Egg recalled 380 million eggs, and Hillandale Farms, which processed eggs from some of Quality Egg LLC's plants, recalled 170 million eggs. Jack DeCoster and Peter DeCoster ultimately plead guilty to the "distribution of adulterated eggs in interstate commerce", and their company Quality Egg LLC admitted to "falsifying expiration dates on egg cartons" as well as to two attempts to bribe a USDA inspector.

=== 2011 ===
- Between July to September 2011, a deadly listeriosis outbreak was traced to cantaloupes from Colorado. 30 people died, making it the second-deadliest recorded U.S. outbreak since the CDC began tracking outbreaks in the 1970s.
- In June 2011, twenty people fell ill from eating cantaloupe from Del Monte Fresh Produce infected with Salmonella serovar Panama from Guatemala. The Centers for Disease Control and Prevention had found that eight of the people sickened had eaten cantaloupes purchased from Costco, and they used the purchase records to figure out that the food in common was cantaloupes, and they had come from the same Guatemalan farm. Del Monte went to court to lift the import ban by the Food and Drug Administration. An investigation found that a pipe carrying raw sewage emptied into an open ditch about 110 yards from the farm's packing house.
- Andrew Williamson Fresh Produce voluntarily recalled one lot of organic grape tomatoes sold under the Limited Edition and Fresh & Easy labels due to a possible health risk from Salmonella.
- Emporia, Kansas-based Tyson Fresh Meats (Tyson Foods) announced it was recalling 131,300 pounds of ground beef products due to possible E. coli O157:H7 contamination.
- E. coli in strawberries from Newberg, Oregon, killed one person on August 8, 2011. The Oregon Health Authority announced that they had linked at least 10 E. coli infections to a strawberry farm in Newberg, Oregon. Four patients had been hospitalized and an elderly woman died from kidney failure associated with her E. coli illness. The strawberries were sold to buyers who resold them at roadside stands and farmer's markets.
- One dead in California from Salmonella and 76 more people sickened in 26 states. On August 3, 2011, Cargill recalled 36,000,000 pounds of fresh and frozen ground turkey products produced at the company's Springdale, Arkansas, facility from February 20, 2011, through August 2, 2011, due to possible contamination from Salmonella serovar Heidelberg.
- In March and April 2011, Jennie-O recalled almost 55,000 pounds of turkey burgers because drug-resistant Salmonella was found in its products.
- The FDA said papayas imported from Mexico and distributed by Agromod Produce Inc. of McAllen, Texas, is likely the source of 97 cases of Salmonella Agona. To date, 10 people have been hospitalized but there have been no reported deaths. As a result, all papayas sold before July 23, 2011, were voluntarily recalled by Agromod. The cases were reported between January 1 and July 18 in 23 states. More than half of the cases were women, with ages ranging from 1 to 91 and an average age of 20; Texas had the most cases with 25 people falling ill.

=== 2012 ===
- The 2012 Salmonella outbreak caused sickness in hundreds of people in the Netherlands and the United States via Salmonella-tainted salmon.
- A peanut butter recall was voluntarily issued in September 2012 by Sunland Inc. due to Salmonella. After further investigation, the recall included all 240 products, made at Sunland's production plant in Portales, New Mexico manufactured since March 1, 2010. A total of 35 people from 19 states were sickened from tainted products, most of them children. The Centers for Disease Control (CDC), said the majority of those who became ill claim it was between June 11, 2012, and September 2, 2012. Officials from the Food and Drug Administration (FDA) found Salmonella all over plant including improper handling of the products, unclean equipment and uncovered trailers of peanuts outside the facility. The total of people and states rose to 41 people in 20 states sold by Trader Joe's, Whole Foods, Safeway, Target and other large grocery chains. On November 26, 2012, the FDA suspended Sunland's registration to produce and distribute food product. Sunland had the right to a hearing and prove to the FDA that its facilities are clean and can reopen. Sunland closed and filed for Chapter 7 bankruptcy on October 9, 2013.
- E. coli O157:H7 caused the reported illness of 33 people across 5 U.S. states, carried on organically grown greens like spinach and spring mix. Cases of food poisoning began to be reported in the New York State area on October 18, 2012. This outbreak seems to have originated with food from State Garden, an organic produce company in Chelsea, Massachusetts. There were no deaths reported.

=== 2013 ===
- July – August. The E. coli O157:H7 outbreak at Federico's Mexican Restaurant in Litchfield Park, Arizona, (a suburb of Phoenix) grew to include 79 people. At least 23 people were hospitalized in the outbreak. At least two people developed hemolytic uremic syndrome (HUS), a severe complication that can destroy the kidneys. Victims filed civil suits against Federico's parent company, Femex LLC, in Maricopa County Superior Court.

=== 2014 ===
- As of May 16, 2014, 12 cases of E. coli O157:H7 in 4 states (Massachusetts, Michigan, Missouri, and Ohio) from tainted ground beef from Wolverine Packing Company of Detroit, Michigan.

=== 2015 ===
- In August through September 2015, over 300 people were infected with Salmonella. The bulk of the cases were in California and Arizona with the states of California and Texas having one fatality each. It was traced to cucumbers from Mexico distributed by Andrew & Williamson Fresh Produce who, on September 4, 2015, voluntarily issued a recall.
- In October through November 2015, 45 people contracted E. coli from Chipotle Mexican Grill restaurants. The cases were in Washington State, California, Minnesota, New York, Ohio, and Oregon. At least 16 people were hospitalized. The outbreak warranted the closing and sanitization of over 40 Chipotle restaurants across Washington and Oregon. The restaurants reopened after discarding all supplies and ordering fresh ingredients.

=== 2016 ===
- In April 2016, CRF Frozen Foods recalled over 400 organic and traditional frozen food products sold under 40 different brands due to contamination with Listeria monocytogenes. The outbreak was linked to 8 cases of listeriosis in the United States.

=== 2017 ===
- In April 2017, a contained outbreak of the botulism toxin was confirmed in California, linked to a cheese sauce. There was no recall of the product.

=== 2018 ===
- Beginning in early April 2018, Escherichia coli O157:H7 caused the reported illness of 210 people across 36 states in the US, carried on romaine lettuce from Yuma, Arizona. On or after April 16, 2018, cases of food poisoning began to be reported in the New York State area, prompting a multi-state investigation from the CDC and FDA.
- Beginning on April 13, 2018, the United States Department of Agriculture recalled more than 200 million eggs due to a salmonella outbreak connected to Iowa egg farms, including Rose Acre Farms. It was the largest egg recall since 2010.
- On November 20, 2018, the CDC, the U.S. Food and Drug Administration (FDA), and Health Canada announced that they were investigating a multistate binational outbreak of pathogenic Escherichia coli O157:H7 infections linked to romaine lettuce. This once again prompted romaine lettuce recall. A 2022 study estimated the total societal loss from this recall was in the range of $276–$343 million. This outbreak was separate from the previous outbreak traced to Yuma, Arizona.

== 2020s ==
=== 2021 ===
- A Salmonella outbreak was reported across 14 states in October 2021, with 102 people infected and 19 hospitalized. The source of the infections was reported to be from Denver, Colorado-based seafood supplier Northeast Seafood Products, who supplied seafood products to various grocery stores and restaurants, including Albertsons, Safeway, and Sprouts. Most people infected lived in or had traveled from Colorado.
- Three brands of onions were recalled in October 2021 after a Salmonella outbreak in 37 states. 652 people were infected and 129 were hospitalized.

=== 2023 ===
- In August 2023, three people died and six were hospitalized after drinking milkshakes contaminated with Listeria from a Frugals burger restaurant in Tacoma, Washington.
- A Salmonella outbreak linked to raw (unpasteurized) milk from September 2023 to March 2024 spanned five states, and sickened at least 171 people. The report was not released until July 2025.

=== 2024 ===
- An ongoing listeriosis outbreak began in May 2024, and has been traced to liverwurst produced at the Jarratt, VA Boar's Head deli meat facility. 7 million pounds of deli meat were recalled in July in conjunction with the 2024 United States listeriosis outbreak. USDA inspection records released under the Freedom of Information Act revealed 69 noncompliances at the Jarratt facility in the year preceding the outbreak. These noncompliances included heavy meat buildup on equipment and walls, condensation blowing onto uncovered meat product, insects entering and leaving pickle vats, as well as mold and mildew at staff handwashing sinks.
- In October 2024, an E. coli outbreak was linked to McDonald's Quarter Pounder in 10 U.S. states (Colorado, Kansas, Utah, Wyoming, and portions of Idaho, Iowa, Missouri, Montana, Nebraska, Nevada, New Mexico, and Oklahoma). The CDC has not confirmed the origin, but it is suspected to be either the quarter-pound meat patties or slivered onions. As of October 22, there have been 49 cases, 10 hospitalizations, and 1 death.

=== 2025 ===
- An ongoing listeria outbreak has been linked to ready made pasta meals from Nates Fine Foods, Inc sold at the Delicatessen counter at Safeway, Kroger, Trader Joe's and Sprouts Farmers Market. It was first reported on June 17, 2025.

== See also ==
- List of foodborne illness outbreaks by death toll
- List of foodborne illness outbreaks (countries other than the United States)
