= E. coli outbreak =

E. coli outbreak may refer to:

- 2023 E. coli outbreak in Calgary
- 2018 E. coli outbreak in the United States
- 2014-2015 E. coli outbreak in Dorset
- 2012 organic greens E coli outbreak in the United States
- 2011 E. coli outbreak centered in Northern Germany
- 2009 E. coli outbreak in the United Kingdom
- 2006 E. coli outbreak in North America
- 2005 E. coli outbreak in South Wales
- 2000 E. coli outbreak in Walkerton, Ontario, Canada
- 1996 E. coli outbreak of Odwalla Inc.
