= List of foodborne illness outbreaks by death toll =

This is a list of foodborne illness outbreaks by death toll, caused by infectious disease, heavy metals, chemical contamination, or from natural toxins, such as those found in poisonous mushrooms. Before modern microbiology, foodborne illness was not understood, and, from the mid 1800s to early-mid 1900s, was perceived as ptomaine poisoning, caused by a fundamental flaw in understanding how it worked. While the medical establishment ditched ptomaine theory by the 1930s, it remained in the public consciousness until the late 1960s and early 1970s.

Outside of botulism (which has been well known since the early 1900s and killed often at the time), many other foodborne illnesses such as salmonellosis were not monitored closely or kept careful track of until at least the late 1970s, with overall monitoring only fully taking off after the 1992–1993 Jack in the Box E. coli outbreak.

== Outbreaks caused by infectious agents ==
Year	Event	Agent	Food	Company	Infected	Deaths	Notes
1951	Pont-Saint-Esprit Ergotism Outbreak	Ergot	Baked bread	Local bakery	250	7	
1936	1936 Hamamatsu daifuku ricecake illness outbreak	Unknown	Daifuku rice cake	Miyoshino confectionery store	2,116-2,296	44 (Source:Hamamatsu City, Japanese government, Weekly Bunshun Online)	According to Japanese government official confirmed report, the sports day on May 10, 1936 on Hamamatsu first junior highschool (present day of Hamamatsu West Senior Highschool), Hamamatsu, Shizuoka Prefecture, Japan, where produced by Miyoshino Confectionery Store and distributed to related parties, that daifuku rice cake were distributed to students and staff. The day after the distribution, people who ate the daifuku developed food poisoning, and according to official reports from the Hamamatsu City Health and Welfare Bureau and the Japanese government, 883 students, 1,161 family members of students, 21 staff members, and 51 family members of staff members were infected, some sourse report,this affect number was 2,296 persons, total with 29 students and 15 families were human fatalities, a worst food poison disaster in Japan and Northeast Asia on history, an owner of Japanese confectionery company of Miyoshiya has refused heared by lical official.Template:Citation nedded
1984	1984 Kumamoto mustard lotus root foodborne illness outbreak	''Btulinum toxin''	Mustard lotus root manufacture	Sanko mustard lotus root manufacture	36	11 (Sourse:Kumamoto City, Japanese Welfare Ministry)	According to former Japan Welfare Ministry official confirmed report, on June 9, 1984, mass food poisoning incident involving botulinum spores occurred due to vacuum-packed mustard lotus root manufactured and sold by Sanko mustard lotus root manufacturer, Kumamoto, Kyushu Island based company in Japan, in which 36 people became affected, 11 of whom died.
2017–2018	2017–18 South African listeriosis outbreak	Listeria	processed meat	Enterprise Foods	1,060	216	A widespread listeriosis outbreak from contaminated deli meats from Enterprise Foods, a subsidiary of Tiger Brands. It is the world's worst listeriosis outbreak.
c.1970-1996	vCJD/HSBE in British beef	prions	beef	nationwide beef producers	178	178	Believed to have been caused by supplementing cattle feed with meat and bone meal. Resulted in the slaughter of over four million cattle, and a 10 year ban on exports of British beef.
2011	2011 Germany E. coli O104:H4 outbreak	E. coli O104:H4	fenugreek sprouts		>3,950	53	Deadliest bacterial foodborne outbreak in Europe. Deadliest E. coli outbreak on record.
1985	1985 California listeriosis outbreak in cheese	Listeria	queso fresco	Jalisco Cheese	>86	47 or 52	Deadliest bacterial foodborne outbreak in US.
2011	2011 United States listeriosis outbreak in cantaloupes	Listeria	cantaloupe	Jensen Farms	146	30	Second deadliest bacterial foodborne outbreak in US. Second deadliest listeriosis outbreak.
2008	2008 Canada listeriosis outbreak	Listeria	cold cuts	Maple Leaf Foods	>50	22	Deadliest foodborne outbreak in Canada.
1996	1996 Wishaw (Scotland) E. coli outbreak	E. coli O157	meat	John Barr	496	21	At the time the world's deadliest outbreak of E. coli poisoning. Butchers John M. Barr & Son provided cooked meat products to several events including a birthday party and a pensioners' luncheon club. The source of the contamination was traced to a boiler used for cooking joints and stew, and a vacuum packing machine used for cooked and raw meats. Deadliest outbreak of the 0157 strain.
1998	1998 United States listeriosis outbreak	Listeria	cold cuts and hot dogs	Bil Mar Foods	>100	18 or 21	
2008–2009	2008–2009 Chile listeriosis outbreak	Listeria	cecina, sausages, cheese and other dairy products	Doñihue Limitada	164	16	
2014	2013–2014 Danish listeriosis outbreak	Listeria	spiced lamb roll, pork, sausages, bacon, liver pâté, etc.	Jørn A. Rullepølser	> 37	15	
2024	2023-2024 North American salmonellosis outbreak in cantaloupe	Salmonella	cantaloupe	Malchita	597	15	Caused by Salmonella serovars Sundsvall and Oranienburg.
1985	1985 United States salmonellosis outbreak in milk	Salmonella	milk	Hillfarm Dairy	5,295	9	Caused by Salmonella serovar Typhimurium.
2008	2008 United States salmonellosis outbreak in peanuts	Salmonella	peanuts	Peanut Corporation of America	>200	9	Largest foodborne Salmonella outbreak in peanut butter. One of the largest food recalls in United States history.
2002	2002 United States listeriosis outbreak in poultry	Listeria	poultry	Pilgrim's Pride	>50	8	
2015–present	European listeriosis outbreak (2015–present)	Listeria	frozen corn suspected	Hungarian supplier →Hungarian processing company →Polish storage service →Polish packer	32	6	As of 8 March 2018, the ongoing outbreak has affected five European Union countries: Austria: 2 confirmed cases (1 fatal); Denmark: 4 confirmed cases (1 fatal); Finland: 14 confirmed cases (2 fatal); Sweden: 6 confirmed cases (2 fatal); United Kingdom: 6 confirmed cases (no fatalities)
1992–1993	1993 Jack in the Box E. coli outbreak	E. coli O157:H7	undercooked hamburgers	Jack in the Box	>700	4	First deadly foodborne E. coli O157:H7 outbreak.
2003	2003 Chi-Chi's hepatitis A outbreak	Hepatitis A virus	green onions		555	3	Largest foodborne hepatitis outbreak.
2006	2006 North American E. coli O157:H7 outbreak in spinach	E. coli O157:H7	spinach	Dole Foods	>205	3	
2024	2024 Canadian listeriosis outbreak	Listeria	nut milk	Silk and Great Value	20	3	Listeria contamination in various nut milk products led to at least 20 cases of listeriosis, including 3 deaths in Ontario between August 2023 and July 2024.
1963	1963 botulism case from canned tuna	Botulinum toxin	canned tuna	A&P		2	
1922	1922 Loch Maree botulism outbreak	Botulinum toxin	duck paste	Lazenby's	8	8	Six guests and two staff members at the Loch Maree Hotel in Scotland were fatally poisoned by sandwiches made with duck paste contaminated with botulinum toxin. This was the first incident in the UK in which botulism was conclusively identified as the cause and remains the only large incident of microbial food contamination in the UK with 100% reported fatalities.
1971	1971 botulism case from Bon Vivant soup	Botulinum toxin	vichyssoise soup	Bon Vivant Company	2	1	
1996	1996 Odwalla E. coli outbreak	E. coli O157:H7	unpasteurized apple juice	Odwalla	66	1	Unpasteurized juice sold for the health market. Rotten apples used when safety officer was overruled.
2005	2005 South Wales E. coli O157 outbreak	E. coli O157	meat	local butcher	157	1	Largest E. coli outbreak in Wales. Second largest E. coli outbreak in UK.
2017	2017 Valley Oak Nacho Cheese botulism outbreak	Botulinum toxin	nacho cheese	gas station	10	1	A poorly maintained nacho cheese machine lead to the contamination of the cheese and the sicking of 10 people with botulism, one of whom later died.
1994	Salmonella in ice cream	Salmonella	ice cream	Schwan's Sales Enterprises	224,000	0	An estimated 224,000 people across the United States suffered from gastroenteritis caused by Salmonella serovar Enteritidis after eating Schwan's ice cream when raw, unpasteurized eggs were hauled in a tanker truck that later carried pasteurized ice cream to the Schwan's plant, and the ice cream premix was not pasteurized after delivery to the plant.

== Outbreaks caused by chemical contamination ==
Year	Event	Food	Contaminant	Location	Affected	Deaths	Notes
1971	1971 Iraq poison grain disaster	wheat, barley	methylmercury	Iraq	>650	650	Seeds treated with methylmercury as a fungicide for planting were used as food
1981	1981 Spain rapeseed oil toxicity	rapeseed oil	possibly aniline	Spain	~25,000	600	Industrial oil sold as food oil.
1955	Morinaga milk arsenic poisoning	powdered milk	arsenic	Japan	13,389	>600	By mistake, an industrial grade Monosodium phosphate was added to milk produced by Morinaga Milk Industry, which contained an impurity of 5–8% arsenic. The milk powder was used for feeding infants, and many babies were poisoned. By 1981, there were still >6,000 people affected as adults with severe intellectual disabilities and other health effects; and by 2006, >600 adults remained affected.
1900	1900 English beer poisoning	beer	arsenic	England	>6,000	>70	Arsenic was introduced into beer via contaminated sugar. Outbreak made worse by mass-misdiagnosis of the victims' illnesses.
1942	1942 Oregon State Hospital poisoning	scrambled eggs	sodium fluoride	United States	467	47	Instead of powdered milk, sodium fluoride, a poison to kill cockroaches, had been accidentally used in the cooking process
2005	Mabini food poisoning incident	fritters	carbamate	Philippines	~100	28	Pesticide ingredient was believed to have been inadvertently mixed with cassava flour used in making the snacks which were then sold to schoolchildren
1858	1858 Bradford sweets poisoning	candy	arsenic trioxide	England	~200	20	Arsenic was accidentally sold as "daft". Daft was a standard adulterant to bulk up the candy
2008	2008 Chinese milk scandal	milk	melamine and urea	China	>300,000	6	Milk diluted with water then melamine added to fool the test for protein content
(c)1930	"Jake leg" affair	Jamaica ginger	tricresyl phosphate	USA	~40,000	0	Tricresyl phosphate, at the time thought to be non-toxic, was used to adulterate ginger extract made by Hub Product Corp., sold as a patent medicine and drunk for its high alcohol content. Thousands of people suffered permanent peripheral nerve damage, causing a loss of manual dexterity and a peculiar gait known as "Jake leg"

== See also ==
- List of epidemics
- List of food contamination incidents
