= 2024 United States listeriosis outbreak =

Widespread outbreak of food poisoning

- Disease: Listeriosis
- Pathogen: Listeria monocytogenes
- Source: Liverwurst prepared by Boar's Head Provision Company
- Location: United States
- First reported: July 19, 2024
- Date: May – November 21, 2024
- Hospitalized cases: 60 (cumulative)
- Deaths: 10

The 2024 United States listeriosis outbreak was a widespread outbreak of listeriosis, connected to deli meats produced by Boar's Head Provision Company at a plant in Greensville County, Virginia, near the town of Jarratt. The outbreak was first reported in July 2024, although the first cases were later discovered to have been in May 2024. At least 10 people in the United States died and 60 were hospitalized, by the time the outbreak ended in November.

On July 30, 2024, Boar's Head issued a recall for over 7 million pounds (3.2 million kilograms) of meat products manufactured at the company's plant in Jarratt, Virginia. Inspectors from the United States Department of Agriculture had logged 69 regulatory violations during inspections of the plant between August 2023 and August 2024, with officials observing black mold, mildew, insects, blood pooling on the floor, and foul odors.

== Background ==
=== Jarratt, Virginia plant ===
Boar's Head Provision Company was founded in 1905 in Brooklyn, New York. It opened a plant in Greensville County, Virginia, near the town of Jarratt, in July 1983. The Jarratt plant was expanded in 1985, adding over 100 workers to the plant's workforce of 140.

The United States Environmental Protection Agency sued Boar's Head in 1998, alleging that the company failed to report its storage of hazardous chemicals at the Jarratt plant. Improperly reported chemicals included fuel oil, carbon dioxide, propane, and anhydrous ammonia. The case was settled in March 1999, and Boar's Head was fined $34,000. The EPA cited the Jarratt plant again in 2014, fining Boar's Head $24,000 after a sodium hydroxide leak was not properly reported.

The 136-acre (55 ha) plant was one of two plants operated by Boar's Head in Virginia. It produced beef and pork products, including bacon, ham, hot dogs, and liverwurst. The Jarratt plant employed approximately 500 workers in 2024, represented by United Food and Commercial Workers Local 400.

=== Listeriosis outbreaks ===
Foodborne illnesses have the potential to infect and kill hundreds of people. The Centers for Disease Control and Prevention estimates that in the United States, 1600 people are infected and 260 people die from listeriosis per year. Listeriosis is caused by the Listeria monocytogenes bacteria, which is uniquely able to survive and reproduce at low temperatures, such as those found in the cold chain. Listeriosis is especially harmful to pregnant people, newborns, older adults, and immunocompromised people.

Public health authorities track foodborne illness outbreaks through PulseNet, an international system of data sharing in operation since 1996. When outbreaks of foodborne illness occur, public health authorities collect samples from sick patients and contaminated foods, and the bacteria in them are analyzed by PulseNet for similarities. PulseNet was upgraded beginning in 2016 to use whole genome sequencing, which allows for faster and more precise analysis of bacteria across the system, which includes 80 laboratories in the United States.

Major outbreaks of listeriosis have occurred in the United States in the 2010s and 2020s, including a 2011 outbreak linked to cantaloupes grown in Colorado, which killed 33 people. A smaller outbreak of listeriosis on the East Coast in 2022 killed one person in Maryland and was linked to deli meats that were sliced to order. In the 2022 outbreak, no specific source of the outbreak was identified.

== Timeline ==
Inspectors from the Virginia Department of Agriculture and Consumer Services, acting on behalf of the United States Department of Agriculture (USDA), raised concerns about the Jarratt plant in 2022. Their inspection reports identified "major deficiencies" and an "imminent threat" at the plant, including mold, damp conditions, and rust. Despite these findings, the plant was allowed to continue operating, a decision that was criticized by food safety experts following the outbreak.

A sample collected from a sick patient on May 29, 2024 was retroactively discovered to be the first case of the outbreak, as identified by PulseNet. The Centers for Disease Control and Prevention (CDC) announced that it was investigating an outbreak of listeriosis on July 19, which was broadly associated with sliced meats from deli counters, including turkey, liverwurst, and ham. As of July 19, 28 people were hospitalized due to the contaminated meats, and 2 people had died.

Investigators from the Maryland Department of Health interviewed patients in the state who were sick with listeriosis, all of whom were elderly, and suspected that the food that they had eaten would be unpopular with younger people. Further investigation concluded that the patients interviewed had all eaten liverwurst. The Maryland Department of Health tested samples of liverwurst from a supermarket in Baltimore, and discovered Listeria contamination in a package of Boar's Head Strassburger Brand Liverwurst.

Boar's Head recalled 207,528 lb (94,133 kg) of liverwurst and other products on July 26, following the Maryland Department of Health's announcement. Four days later, on July 30, the recall was expanded to over 7 million lb (3.2 million kg) of meats made at the Jarratt plant. By July 30, 34 cases of listeriosis were reported. The expanded recall included 71 products, some of which were exported outside the United States. With the expansion of the recall, Boar's Head announced that it would suspend production of some products at the Jarratt plant.

On November 21, CDC officials announced that the outbreak was over. During its course, at least 10 people in the United States died and 60 were hospitalized. On January 10, 2025, the USDA published a report summarizing its findings and recommendations.

== Impacted products ==
The Jarratt, Virginia plant produced 80 products that were included in the recalls. The initial recall was associated with Boar's Head Strassburger Brand Liverwurst, which was sliced to order at deli counters nationwide. Other products in the initial recall on July 19 included 8 varieties of bacon, bologna, ham, and salami that were produced on June 27.

The expanded recall, issued on July 30, covered all products made at the Jarratt plant. 71 products were included in the expanded recall, including products distributed under the Boar's Head and Old Country brands. Most of the products were distributed in the United States, with limited distribution to Mexico, Panama, the Dominican Republic, and the Cayman Islands. Products in the expanded recall also included multiple types of sausages, Canadian bacon, and head cheese.

== Analysis ==
Food safety experts, as quoted by major news sources, criticized Boar's Head and the USDA for allowing the Jarratt plant to remain open, and commented on the plant's procedures and inspection reports.

In an August 2024 New York Times article, Neal Fortin, the director of the Institute for Food Laws & Regulations at Michigan State University, criticized Boar's Head for its method of managing Listeria contamination at the Jarratt plant. Fortin argued that the company's procedure, which emphasized facility sanitation and testing for Listeria, was inadequate in comparison to other industry-standard methods, which are more advanced. Fortin also commented that he would not personally eat deli meats prepared at plants that relied solely on sanitation and testing.

Ohio State University processed meat safety expert C. Lynn Knipe, in a September interview with the Richmond Times-Dispatch, compared the safety procedures at the Jarratt plant to its sibling in Petersburg, Virginia. Knipe commented that he "was very impressed with their [the Petersburg plant's] processing methods," which involved cooking ham products in their retail packaging, eliminating risks of Listeria contamination during packaging.

Barbara Kowalcyk, director of the Institution for Food Safety and Nutrition Security at George Washington University, described the Jarratt plant's condition as "honestly shocking" in a September 2024 Washington Post interview. Kowalcyk criticized regulators for allowing the plant to remain open, commenting that she "cannot understand why they didn't take action."

== Aftermath ==
On September 3, 2024, a wrongful death lawsuit was filed against Boar's Head by the family of a deceased 88-year-old man which alleges is a direct result of Boar's Head contaminated deli meat consumption.

By September 6, 2024, at least seven lawsuits, including three class action, were filed against Boar's Head following the Listeria outbreak alleging breach of warranty, failing to disclose a potential risk of bacterial contamination, false advertising, manufacturing defects, misleading the public, negligence, violations of Alabama's product liability law, and wrongful death.

Following the outbreak and recall, Boar's Head announced the permanent closure of the Jarratt plant on September 13. The approximately 500 workers at the plant were offered opportunities to transfer to other Boar's Head facilities, or severance packages. UFCW Local 400, the union representing workers at the Jarratt plant, criticized the closure, arguing that "this unprecedented tragedy was not the fault of the workforce." The company also announced that it would permanently discontinue its liverwurst products.

== See also ==
- 2011 United States listeriosis outbreak
- 2025 United States listeriosis outbreak
