= GNPC =

GNPC may refer to:

- Glass Nickel Pizza Company, Italian restaurant based in Madison, Wisconsin
- Ghana National Petroleum Corporation (GNPC), state agency responsible for petroleum-related activities in Ghana.
- Glassile Nurayum Platile Curryum (GNPC), Indian secret Facebook group
