= 2025 United States listeriosis outbreak =

Widespread outbreak of food poisoning

- Pathogen: Listeria monocytogenes
- Source: Pasta meal products produced by Nate's Fine Foods
- Location: United States
- Date: June 2025 – February 2026
- Hospitalized cases: 27
- Deaths: 7

The 2025 United States listeriosis outbreak was a widespread outbreak of listeriosis linked to pre-made pasta meal products traced back to Nate's Fine Foods and distributed in national grocery store chains across the country. The outbreak was first reported in June 2025, and as of November 5, there have been cases in 18 states: California, Florida, Hawaii, Illinois, Indiana, Louisiana, Michigan, Minnesota, Missouri, North Carolina, Nevada, Ohio, Oregon, South Carolina, Texas, Utah, Virginia, and Washington. The case was closed by the Centers for Disease Control and Prevention (CDC) in February 2026.

== Background ==
There were previously been listeriosis outbreaks in the United States, most recently being an outbreak in 2024 linked to deli meats in Virginia.

Pregnant women, newborns, and elderly with immunodeficiency are most at risk of developing symptoms. Common symptoms include fever, fatigue, and muscle aches. Particularly for pregnant women, more serious conditions can include miscarriages, premature delivery, or life-threatening infection of newborns. Listeriosis takes 3–4 weeks to incubate human cells and show symptoms, making it difficult to properly monitor the outbreak across different states. Furthermore, some people recover without medical care and are not tested, leaving their cases unreported.

== Timeline ==
The outbreak started in June 2025, when several brands issued recalls of ready-to-eat chicken fettucine Alfredo meal products made by FreshRealm Inc., which were being sold under the brands Home Chef and Marketside at Kroger and Walmart respectively. Prior to this, in February 2025, around two million baked goods, including those sold by large businesses like Dunkin', were recalled over concerns of listeria.

In response, businesses began testing their pasta samples, some of which returned as positive for Listeria in September 2025. Further testing confirmed it was the same strain in previously recalled products, and prompted the recall of two additional products, which shared the same pasta supplier, Nate's Fine Foods.

Nate's later expanded their call to include batches of other precooked pasta, including fettucine, linguine, and farfalle. In addition to Kroger and Walmart, their products were also sold at Sprouts Farmers Market, Albertsons, and Trader Joe's stores.

A FDA update from October 30 reported seven new cases and three new states, along with two additional deaths from Hawaii and Oregon respectively.

In February 2026, the CDC officially closed the case for the outbreak. There were 27 total hospitalizations and 7 deaths across 19 states.

== See also ==
- 2011 United States listeriosis outbreak
- 2024 United States listeriosis outbreak
