= Naked Juice =

American brand

- Product type: Smoothies and Coconut Water
- Current owner: PAI Partners (61%); PepsiCo (39%)
- Country: United States
- Introduced: 1983
- Markets: United States
- Website: nakedjuice.com

Naked Juice is an American brand that produces juices and smoothies. The company is based in Monrovia, California and is owned by PAI Partners. The first Naked Juice drink was produced in 1983 and sold in California under the name "Naked Juice", referring to the composition of no artificial flavors, added sugar, or preservatives. Distribution has since expanded, and Naked Juice products are distributed in the United States, as well as in Canada, the United Kingdom, the Netherlands and France, among others.

As of 2011, the Naked Juice product line consisted of more than 20 different drinks, including fruit juices, juice smoothies, and protein smoothies, along with other beverages like coconut water. The drinks are promoted as containing high concentrations of antioxidants.

== History ==
The Naked Juice Company was created in Santa Monica, California in 1983 by Jimmy Rosenberg and David Bleeden. The name came from the pair's affinity for nude sunbathing. Rosenberg began on a small scale, producing the fruit drinks at his home and selling them under the "Naked Juice" name in-person on the beaches in Santa Monica. The packaging design changed with a re-branding across the Naked Juice line in 2005, which was credited in part for helping Naked Juice pass the former industry leader in terms of annual retail sales, Odwalla. As demand for its products increased, so did the complexity of distribution. Due to the composition of its juices - namely the purposeful lack of preservatives - Naked Juice beverages are highly perishable, must be kept below 38 °F, and have a shorter shelf life than some competing products. In order to alleviate potential supply limitations in early 2006, the company opened two new direct delivery centers in Sacramento, California and Seattle, Washington.

In November 2006, PepsiCo announced plans to acquire Naked Juice from its prior owners, North Castle Partners, for an undisclosed sum. The acquisition, which was completed in 2007, was recognized as marking PepsiCo's more recent shift towards ownership of food and beverage brands with a health and wellness aspect. At this time, Naked Juice had recorded annual sales of $150 million within the U.S. According to financial industry analysts, this acquisition was initiated in part to compete with The Coca-Cola Company's 2001 purchase of Naked Juice rival Odwalla.

The Naked Juice brand has operated as a wholly owned subsidiary of PepsiCo, under the parent company's PepsiCo Americas Beverages division. Naked Juice continued to conduct business in its Azusa, California headquarters until February 2010, when its offices were relocated to the neighboring city of Monrovia, California. Due in part to PepsiCo's scale of existing distributors, Naked Juice has since expanded to be sold in all 50 states within the U.S., as well as in Canada and the U.K.

In 2021, PepsiCo sold the brand to private equity firm PAI Partners.

== Controversies ==
=== Class-action lawsuit ===
In 2012, a lawsuit was filed against the company and on July 2, 2013, the Naked Juice Company settled a class-action lawsuit which argued that many of the bottle's purported claims were false and misleading to the public. Specifically, claims that the product was "100% Juice", was "All Natural", contained "Nothing Artificial", and was "Non-GMO" were all at issue. Specifically the lawsuit indicated that certain ingredients, listed as vitamins, as displayed in the ingredient list of the nutrition facts, were actually synthetically produced, artificial sweeteners, fibers, and flavors which belied the claim the product was "All Natural" and contained only juice. The company agreed to stop using 'all natural' to describe its products due to lack of detailed regulatory guidance around the word ‘natural’, after agreeing to settle a class action for $9m.

=== Sugar content ===
Many Naked juices contain more sugar per ounce than soft drinks. For example, Naked's "Pomegranate Blueberry" contains some 61g of sugar—5.3 tablespoons of sugar in a single bottle. That equates to 1 teaspoon of sugar in every ounce of juice. This amount of sugar is greater than Coca-Cola, which contains 3.25g of sugar per ounce. Naked's "Green Machine" contains 3.5g of sugar per ounce, more than Pepsi Cola's 3.42g per ounce. Naked juice is advertised as Pepsi's "Good for you" product line despite an even higher sugar content.

== Products ==
The Naked Juice product line consists of more than 20 variants of straight and blended 100-percent fruit and vegetable juices. Some of the products are produced in a smoothie consistency, while others remain in juice form. The juices are a combination of flash pasteurized fruits, vegetable juices and purees. Among the primary flavors of Naked Juice are strawberry banana, blue machine, green machine, orange mango and berry veggie which contains purple carrots, red beets, sweet potatoes, sweet corn, chick peas, sweet cherries, strawberries, plum, apple, and a hint of lemon.

In addition to juice flavor variants, since 2006 additional Naked Juice versions have been produced with a focus on specific health aspects such as digestion, protein and reduced-caloric content. In 2007, Naked Juice Probiotic was introduced, having been represented as the first 100-percent juice smoothie to contain probiotics for the aid in digestion. A protein-focused line of Naked Juice smoothies (marketed as protein zone) was first introduced in the early 2000s, with the addition of mango and double berry flavors in 2009. Two reduced-calorie Naked Juice smoothies were introduced in 2010: tropical and peach guava. Both of these products contain coconut juice, which is naturally lower in caloric content in comparison to other fruits.

Also in 2010, The Naked Juice Company added a 100-percent coconut water product, marketed under the name Naked Coconut Water, and sold within the U.S. in Whole Foods stores.

Naked Juice drinks are produced in 10, 15.2, 32, 64, and 128-US fluid ounce sizes; though not all flavors are packaged in all size formats. In 2009, Naked Juice changed the packaging used for its 32-ounce bottles to a variant consisting of 100-percent post-consumer recycled plastic PET (polyethylene terephthalate), the first beverage with national distribution in the United States to implement this packaging type. The new bottle design, referred to as "reNEWabottle" by the company, was extended to the 10, 15.2 and 64-ounce sizes in 2010, resulting in the reduction in new plastic consumption by a rate of 7,000,000 pounds (3,175,147 kg) per year.
