= Bare Naked Beer =

Bare Naked Beer (Artisan Brewing Co.) was a Welsh Craft Beer micro-brewery based in Pontcanna, Cardiff.

== Products ==
Bare Naked Beer created a limited range of continental style, vegan friendly, preservative and additive free craft beer. Their range consisted of Helles Lager, Bavarian Wheat, Kolsch, AltBeer and Smoker Lager with special and seasonal beers released intermittently, available on keg and in 500ml bottle.

The company's beers were mainly sold direct from the brewery, with some distribution in independent venues throughout Cardiff and South Wales.

== History ==
Bare Naked Beer was founded by Simon Doherty in 2008. Doherty, originally from Australia, started homebrewing at the age of 16 when his father bought him his first homebrew kit. Next door to his school was a homebrew shop, owned by the town's most prominent homebrewer. Doherty build a friendship with the owner and gained a lot of tips and tricks on how to brew beer.

After his period in education, Doherty searched for a job in the craft beer industry in Melbourne, however jobs in the industry were few and far between at the time. Having a love for artisanal beer he moved on to the next thing he could think of, which was growing increasingly popular in Melbourne, wine.

Doherty eventually found himself being sent to France as a vintner working at the prestigious Château Lynch-Bages. After this stint, he moved to Cardiff. Shortly after, he was presented with the opportunity to set up a brewery in the Kings Road Courtyard in Pontcanna with financial help from another start up brewery who are no longer involved. Whilst setting up the beginnings of the brewery, Simon was working in the hospitality industry as a manager in a members club. Ultimately being made redundant, with outgoings on rent, equipment and stock, Doherty decided to take this redundancy on the chin and start brewing full-time. Shortly after his redundancy, he threw the first micro beer festival in the courtyard which was the beginnings of a monthly Bar Open which was well attended by the Cardiff community.

All the proceeds from this first micro festival funded Simon so he was able to launch full pelt into Bare Naked Beer.

In 2009, Doherty expanded the brewery, knocking into the behind unit that was previously used as an art gallery, doubling the brewery's size, building himself a cold storage area, with this he was able to buy lager tanks to help him with the traditional storage of his continental-style beers.

== Bare Naked Beer Vs PepsiCo. ==
In 2010, the investment from the other brewery was pulled, the brewery was stripped of all equipment and Simon was left with nothing other than a garage and the knowledge he picked up from the fabricator him and his then partner had hired to fabricate their brew kit. Thus, Simon fabricated a new kit himself.

It was at this time he received a cease and desist from drinks giants PepsiCo, the second largest drinks company in the world. The trademark 'Bare Naked Beer' was too close to PepsiCo's Naked Juice. With little funds, Simon represented himself in court. After a 2-year court case, the court ruled in PepsiCo's favour. Simon was given 3 months to come up with a new name for Bare Naked Beer, so launched a naming competition, however none of these were used. After spending time with a family member who was playing around with anagrams at the time - PIPES BEER was born.
