= 2008 United States salmonellosis outbreak =

Disease outbreak in the United States

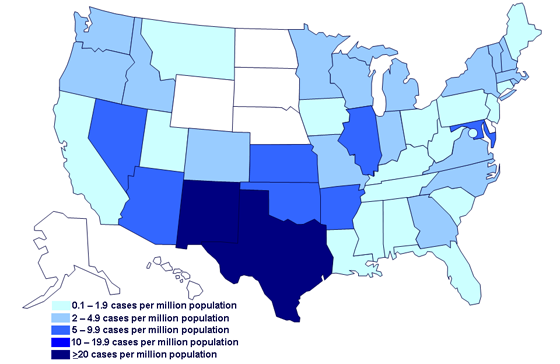
CDC map of cases per million residents

The 2008 United States salmonellosis outbreak was an outbreak of salmonellosis across multiple U.S. states due to Salmonella enterica serovar Saintpaul. Over the course of the outbreak, 1442 cases were identified across 43 U.S. states, the District of Columbia, and Canada. The U.S. Centers for Disease Control and Prevention (CDC) investigation determined that jalapeño peppers imported from Mexico as well as serrano peppers were major sources of the outbreak. Tomatoes may have been a source as well. The outbreak lasted from April to August 2008.

== Outbreak ==
From April 10 to August 31, 2008, Salmonella enterica serovar Saintpaul caused at least 1442 cases of salmonellosis in 43 U.S. states, the District of Columbia, and Canada. New Mexico and Texas had the greatest prevalence of disease with over 20 cases per million residents. The greatest number of reported cases occurred in Texas (559 reported cases), New Mexico (115), Illinois (120), and Arizona (59). Other significantly impacted states included Georgia (42 cases), New York (41), Maryland (39), Oklahoma (38), Massachusetts (31), and Virginia (31). Five cases were reported in residents of Canada, four of whom appeared to have been infected after traveling to the United States. The outbreak resulted in at least 286 hospitalizations, and may have contributed to 2 deaths.

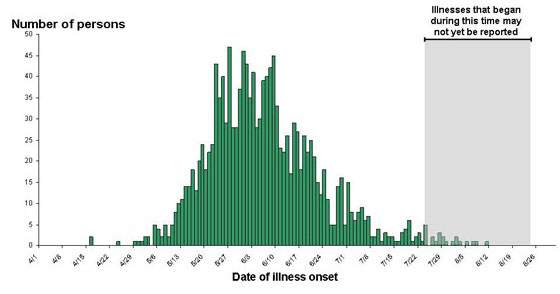
Epidemic curve for 2008 U.S. Salmonellosis outbreak

== Investigation ==
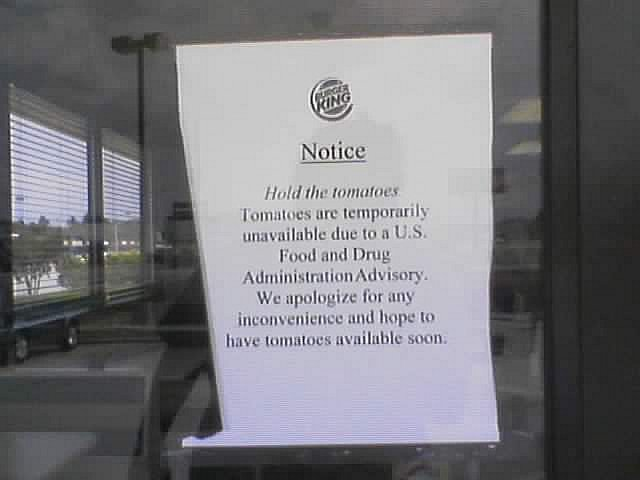
A sign posted at a Havelock, North Carolina Burger King telling customers that no tomatoes are available due to the outbreak.

In May, 2008 the CDC, New Mexico Department of Health, Texas Department of Health, and the Indian Health Service conducted a case–control study to identify foods associated with the disease outbreak. They found that salmonellosis was significantly associated with consuming raw tomatoes, but not with consuming salsa, guacamole, or any other food item. In June, a cluster of 33 cases associated with a restaurant-chain in Texas prompted the CDC and Texas Dept. of Health to conduct a second case-control study. Here they found illness to be significantly associated only with consuming a salsa containing canned tomatoes and raw jalapeño peppers, but not raw tomatoes.

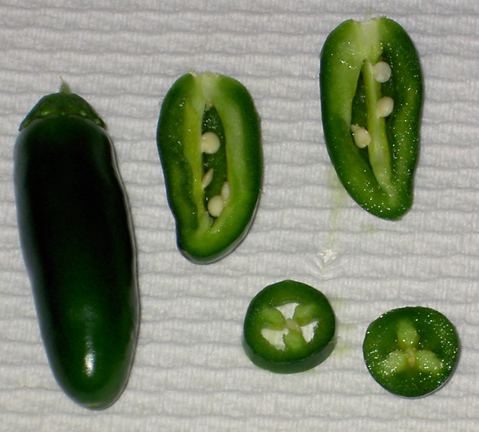
Raw jalapeño peppers were associated with illness in the 2008 outbreak.

As other clusters of illness were identified, case-control studies were again performed to investigate the outbreak source. A multi-state case-control study in late June, 2008 associated illness with consumption of pico de gallo, corn tortillas, or fresh salsa. Another in Minnesota around the same time found that only raw jalapeño peppers were associated with illness. Additionally, in Colorado, the outbreak strain was isolated from jalapeño peppers in the home of a man who had recently been ill. At this point, tomatoes and jalapeño peppers were considered the most likely source of the outbreak, however a similar study conducted by the North Carolina Division of Public Health found that illness in a cluster of 13 cases was associated with consumption of a guacamole which did not contain jalapeño peppers, but instead contained serrano peppers.

In July, 2008 the CDC isolated the outbreak strain of Salmonella from jalapeño peppers at a distributor that distributed to restaurants associated with the outbreak, and found that the peppers had likely been imported from a farm in Tamaulipas, Mexico. Later that month, the outbreak strain was isolated from serrano peppers from another farm in Tamaulipas. The outbreak strain could not be isolated from tomato samples from either of these farms, or any distributor that the CDC investigated.

From all of this, the CDC concluded that the major sources of contamination were jalapeño peppers and serrano peppers, while tomatoes may have been an additional source early in the outbreak. The Mexican Agriculture Ministry had contested the findings of the CDC, claiming that the CDC samples were invalid as they were taken after the harvest.

== Response ==
On June 3, in response to early case-control studies, the U.S. Food and Drug Administration (FDA) issued an advisory recommending that consumers in New Mexico and Texas avoid eating some types of raw tomatoes. On June 7, they expanded this advisory to include consumers nationwide. On July 9, the FDA issued a similar nationwide advisory not to consume raw jalapeño peppers. On July 30, this recommendation was narrowed to peppers grown or packed in Mexico.

In response to the outbreak and the FDA and CDC investigations, some distributors recalled affected produce items. On July 19, Grande Produce, LTD announced a recall of jalapeño peppers, serrano peppers, and avocados which has been distributed between May 17 and July 17. Soon thereafter, on July 21 Agricola Zaragoza, Inc. of Texas announced a recall of jalapeño peppers distributed after June 30.

== See also ==
- 1985 United States salmonellosis outbreak
- 1992–1993 Jack in the Box E. coli outbreak
- 2011 United States listeriosis outbreak
- List of foodborne illness outbreaks
