= Hudson Foods Company =

American meat processing company, 1972–1997

Hudson Foods, Inc.
- Industry: Meat processing
- Founded: February 2, 1972 in Rogers, Arkansas
- Founder: James T. Hudson
- Defunct: September 4, 1997
- Fate: Merged with Tyson Foods
- Website: hudsonfoods.com at the WayBack Machine (archived October 11, 1997)

Hudson Foods, Inc. was a meat processing company founded in Rogers, Arkansas in 1972.

== History ==
Hudson Foods was founded on February 2, 1972 by James T. "Red" Hudson, who previously worked as a feed-store clerk for Ralston Purina before becoming vice president of the company's West Central division and had purchased part of the company's broiler operations.

In 1997, the company was the subject of the largest food recall in the United States at the time, with over 25 million pounds of ground beef produced at the company's plant in Columbus, Nebraska recalled due to Escherichia coli O157:H7 contamination. The affected plant was closed indefinitely following the recall and the discovery that the company would carry beef produced from one day over to the next.

Following the recall, Tyson Foods acquired Hudson Foods, which then merged into the company on September 4, 1997.

== See also ==
- Pilgrim's Pride
- Topps Meat Company, another meat processor implicated in an E. coli O157:H7 outbreak
