= Topps Meat Company =

Defunct meat processing company

Topps Meat Company, LLC
- Industry: Meat processing
- Founded: 1940; 86 years ago in Manhattan, New York
- Founder: Benjamin Sachs
- Defunct: October 5, 2007
- Fate: Ceased operations following Escherichia coli O157:H7 outbreak
- Headquarters: Elizabeth, New Jersey
- Parent: Strategic Investment and Holdings (2003-2007)
- Website: toppsmeat.com at the WayBack Machine (archived August 16, 2006)

The Topps Meat Company, LLC was a privately owned meat processing company based in Elizabeth, New Jersey. The company produced and distributed frozen ground beef patties and other meat products processed at its 3,000-square-foot (280 m^{2}) plant in Elizabeth and posted about $8.8 million a year in sales, according to information reported by Dun & Bradstreet.

In 2007, the Topps Meat Company's products were linked to an outbreak of Escherichia coli O157:H7 (E. coli O157:H7) infections and, on October 5 of that year, the company ceased operations.

== History ==
The Topps Meat Company was founded in Manhattan, New York by Benjamin Sachs in 1940. He would later sell the company to his son, Steven Sachs. Prior to relocating to New Jersey, Joseph D’Urso became vice president of the company.

In 2003, the company was purchased by Strategic Investment and Holdings, an investment firm based in Buffalo, New York, following the death of D'Urso.

Prior to the 2007 E. coli O157:H7 outbreak Topps Meat was implicated in, an inspection report by the United States Department of Agriculture in 2005 discovered that the company had received processed meat contaminated with the bacteria, which they began to process before being notified of the contamination. The same year, the company settled a $1.7 million lawsuit with a maintenance worker whose arm was amputated by an industrial processor and was sued by a 9-year-old girl who claimed to have fallen ill after eating a hamburger made by the company.

=== Escherichia coli O157:H7 outbreak and closure ===
The first reported case of illness linked to E. coli O157:H7 contamination occurred on July 5, 2007. The first positive test results for E. coli contamination of Topps' products were returned on September 7, 2007, but the USDA waited to confirm the tests before ordering a recall 18 days later, a decision that was met with criticism.

In September 2007, Topps Meat Company ultimately recalled 21.7 million pounds of frozen ground beef products due to Escherichia coli O157:H7 contamination concerns. Product samples subsequently tested positive for contamination with E. coli.

On October 4, 2007, a class-action lawsuit was filed against Topps Meat over the contaminated meat and its consequences. The same day, the USDA served Topps Meat with a "notice of intended enforcement" after discovering "inadequate process controls" in the company’s non-ground beef production processes. On October 5, 2007, Topps Meat ceased operations; 77 workers were laid off while about 10 others remained employed to assist the USDA's investigation.

A total of 40 people in eight states fell ill after consuming hamburgers made by Topps Meat Co. At the time, the recalls of Topps' products were the second-largest beef recall in United States history, after Hudson Foods Company's recall of 25 million pounds of ground beef in 1997.

== See also ==
- List of United States foodborne illness outbreaks
