= Sunland Inc. =

American food production plant

- Industry: Food processing
- Founded: 1988
- Defunct: 2013
- Fate: Bankruptcy, purchased by Golden Boy Food
- Headquarters: Portales, New Mexico
- Services: Organic peanut butter processing

Sunland, Inc., was a production plant established in 1988 located in Portales, New Mexico, in the United States. Sunland was the nation's largest organic peanut butter processor. The company produced at least 240 products. The company used Valencia peanuts in its products. After a 2012 product recall, the plant was closed, and then purchased by Golden Boy Foods Ltd. in a bankruptcy auction. On September 21, 2015, the plant re-opened under ownership of Ready Roast. The plant was acquired by Hampton Farms in 2020. In 2024, the plant was destroyed in a fire, with Hampton Farms stating it planned on rebuilding.

== History ==
Sunland Inc. was established in 1988 located in Portales, New Mexico, in the United States. Sunland was the nation's largest organic peanut butter processor. It processed Valencia peanuts, a sweet variety unique to the area, that is preferred for natural butters because of its sweet flavor without additives. It became the largest organic peanut butter plant in the United States. It purchased peanuts from local farmers within a 200 mile radius of Portales, with around 150 workers, as of 2012. It produced both organic and non-organic products.

=== 2012 product recall ===
In September 2012, Sunland issued an initial recall of the peanut butter it made and distributed due to Salmonella contamination. Officials from the Food and Drug Administration (FDA) found Salmonella bacteria all over the plant, as well as improper handling of the products, unclean equipment and uncovered trailers of peanuts outside the facility, expanding the recall to include all the company's products.

The recall, which covered batches made between March 1, 2010 and September 24, 2012, included 240 nut butter products, including brands by Archer Farms, Starbucks, Harry & David, Kirkland Organic, Trader Joe's, Whole Foods, and others. In October 2012, several shipments of Uncrustables sandwiches were recalled as well. Smucker's tests its own products, and no illnesses were attributed to Uncrustables sandwiches. Four brands of Smith Dairy Products ice cream brands were recalled as well.

Ultimately, the outbreak sickened 41 people in 20 states. Before the event, Sunland had never had any products recalled. After the recall was announced, staff were reassigned from production to cleaning the plant.

=== Suspended registration ===
On November 26, 2012, the FDA suspended Sunland's registration to produce and distribute food product.

Sunland had the right to a hearing and prove to the FDA that its facilities were clean and could reopen. It was the first time ever that the FDA had shut food operations without a court hearing, using a 2011 food safety law signed by President Barack Obama. The move, which closed the largest employer in Portales, was poorly received by local farmers, with some worried they wouldn't be paid for their crops of Valencia peanuts. Peanut processing resumed in late November, 2012. After remaining open for five months, it shut down in December 2013 after Sunland's Chapter 7 bankruptcy filing.

=== Bankruptcy auction ===
On October 9, 2013 Sunland closed and filed for Chapter 7 bankruptcy. According to records, the company had an estimated $10 million to $50 million in assets, $50 million to $100 million in liabilities and 1,000 to 5,000 creditors.

In a first round of bidding, it was sold to Hampton Farms in North Carolina, after a $20 million offer. Minutes before the court hearing to approve the sale, a second higher bid was offered. Hampton Farms raised its offer to $25.1 million under protest.

It was sold in March 2014 to Golden Boy Foods in Canada, which outbid Hampton Farms with a $26 million offer. Golden Boy was Western Canada's largest peanut butter manufacturer.

In March 2014, it was reported that nearly a million jars of peanut butter processed by Sunland Inc. had been dumped in a New Mexico landfill. The product had been made with $2.8 million worth of Valencia peanuts owned by Costco, which had refused to sell the products. Costco had tested the jars and authorized their sale, but then rejected them because of leaky peanut oil. The move was denounced by food banks.

=== Resale and fire ===
Instead of re-opening the plant after its purchase, Golden Boy Foods began negotiating a sale. With an unsure timeline for re-opening the plant, many local farmers switched from peanuts to cotton. Many peanut farmers were left unpaid for their 2012 crops acquired by Sunland, with 100 workers laid off. In 2015, Ready Roast, a California-based company, purchased the plant from Golden Boy Foods. On September 21, 2015, a ribbon-cutting ceremony was held to celebrate the re-opening of the plant. Initial employment was 75, with a focus again on Valencia peanuts. Jim Lucero was appointed operator of the plant.

Ready Roast was acquired by Hampton Farms in 2020. By 2024, Hampton Farms in Portales employed 170 people, and was the community's fifth-largest employer. In 2024, the plant underwent a fire, which fire officials allowed to burn for several weeks, saying it was the safest option. There were 6 million tons of peanuts inside at the time. Hampton Farms said it planned on rebuilding.

== See also ==
- List of foodborne illness outbreaks in the United States
