= Hugh Pennington =

British bacteriologist

Professor Hugh Pennington CBE FRCPath FRCPE FMedSci FRSE
- Born: 19 April 1938 (age 88); Edgware, Middlesex, England
- Education: St Thomas's Hospital Medical School
- Spouse: Carolyn Beattie (m. 1966)
- Children: 2
- Scientific career
- Workplaces: University of Aberdeen, University of Wisconsin–Madison, St Thomas's Hospital Medical School

Thomas Hugh Pennington (born 19 April 1938) is emeritus professor of bacteriology at the University of Aberdeen, Scotland. Outside academia, he is best known as the chair of the Pennington Group inquiry into the Scottish Escherichia coli outbreak of 1996 and as Chairman of the Public Inquiry into the 2005 Outbreak of E. coli O157 in South Wales.

== Early life ==
Pennington was educated at Lancaster Royal Grammar School in Lancashire, England. Pennington obtained his MBBS degree in 1962, and his PhD in 1967, both from St Thomas's Hospital Medical School, which became part of United Medical and Dental Schools of Guy's and St Thomas' Hospitals in 1982, and has been known as King's College London School of Medicine and Dentistry since 2005.

== Academic career ==
He spent a year at the University of Wisconsin–Madison before moving to the Glasgow Institute of Virology in 1969, where he researched vaccinia, smallpox and other viruses. He was appointed Chair of Bacteriology at the University of Aberdeen in 1979, where he remained until his retirement in 2003. His research focused on improved bacteria typing, or "fingerprinting", methods, and led to new methods for the investigation of virulence and antibiotic resistance in a number of important pathogens including Staphylococcus aureus, Haemophilus influenzae, Neisseria meningitidis, and Escherichia coli O157:H7. He also wrote on the history of science and medicine such as the introduction of antiseptic surgery to Aberdeen by Alexander Ogston using a Lister 'steam spray producer'. He was dean of the medical school between 1987 and 1992. Pennington was also awarded a higher doctorate, i.e. DSc.

He retired in 2003 after being a professor of bacteriology for 23 years at the University of Aberdeen.

From 2003 to 2006 he was President of the Society for General Microbiology. He is a member of the Advisory Council for the Campaign for Science and Engineering.

== Pennington Group inquiry ==
In late November 1996, an Escherichia coli outbreak in the town of Wishaw prompted the Scottish Office to establish an expert group, chaired by Pennington. The Pennington Group convened between December 1996 and March 1997. Another case of E. coli infection occurred in Tayside in January 1997 and the group was tasked with investigating the additional outbreak.

== Subsequent public work ==
Following his chairmanship of the E. coli inquiry, Pennington has worked for the UK, Scottish and Welsh governments as an expert on microbiology and food safety, and has also appeared in British media as an expert. He was a member of the Scottish Food Advisory Committee, part of the Food Standards Agency, an agency he recommended the government create. He was a founder member of the World Food Programme Technical Advisory Group. He is the former Vice Chair of the Broadcasting Council for Scotland, which advises the BBC.

He has criticised the UK and German governments for their handling of Bovine spongiform encephalopathy (BSE) and the NHS for their handling of MRSA. He chaired a 2005 inquiry into a Welsh E. coli outbreak. The 2005 Outbreak of E. coli O157 in South Wales Public Inquiry report was published in March 2009.

In 2003, Pennington published When Food Kills, a popular science book on the topic of BSE, E. coli and public food safety.

He was appointed Commander of the Order of the British Empire (CBE) in the 2013 Birthday Honours for services to microbiology and food hygiene.

In November 2015 he published Have Bacteria Won?, where he examines mankind's battles against bacteria and whether we should be optimistic about the future.

In September 2022 he published COVID-19: The Postgenomic Pandemic, an account of how the post-genomic era (after 2008) changed how we understood and dealt with pandemics such as the COVID-19 virus.

== Personal life ==
He married Carolyn Beattie in 1966 in Maidstone, Kent. They have two daughters.

== See also ==
- 1964 Aberdeen typhoid outbreak
