= List of foodborne illness outbreaks =

This is a list of foodborne illness outbreaks. A foodborne illness may be from an infectious disease, heavy metals, chemical contamination, or from natural toxins, such as those found in poisonous mushrooms.

== Deadliest ==
- List of foodborne illness outbreaks by death toll

== Canada ==
- 2008 Canada listeriosis outbreak

== China ==
- 2008 Chinese milk scandal

== Germany ==
- 2011 Escherichia coli O104:H4 outbreak

== Japan ==
- Minamata disease
- Niigata Minamata disease
- 1996 Japan E. coli O157:H7

== Russia ==
- 2024 Russian botulism outbreak

== Spain ==
- 1981 Toxic oil syndrome

== United Kingdom ==
- 2005 outbreak of E.coli O157 in South Wales
- 1996 outbreak of E. coli O157 in Lanarkshire, Scotland
- Loch Maree Hotel botulism poisoning

== United States ==
In 1999, an estimated 5,000 deaths, 325,000 hospitalizations, and 76 million illnesses were caused by foodborne illnesses within the US. Such outbreaks have led to food recalls.

== See also ==
- 1984 Rajneeshee bioterror attack
- Eosinophilia–myalgia syndrome
- List of foodborne illness outbreaks by death toll
- List of food contamination incidents
- List of medicine contamination incidents
