= Glass Nickel Pizza Company =

Italian restaurants in Wisconsin

Glass Nickel Pizza Co.
- Type: Privately held company
- Industry: Restaurant
- Founded: 1997
- Founder: Brian Glassel, Tim Nicholson
- Headquarters: Madison, Wisconsin, USA
- Number of locations: 9 restaurants (2020)
- Area served: Wisconsin
- Products: Pizza
- Website: www.glassnickelpizza.com

The Glass Nickel Pizza Co. (GNPC) is a mid-sized delivery, carry-out and dine-in Italian restaurant based in Madison, Wisconsin. Currently, the restaurant has nine locations throughout Wisconsin.

== History ==
The company was founded by Brian Glassel and Tim Nicholson in 1997 on the east side of Madison, Wisconsin. Two years later Timothy Archer and Neil Spath opened a store on Madison's west side. Since then, two more stores have opened in the Madison area: Fitchburg and downtown Sun Prairie, as well as one in Oshkosh. GN Independents, the franchising arm of Glass Nickel Pizza Company, began franchising, with the first franchised store in Green Bay, Wisconsin and the second in Brookfield, Wisconsin. The Sun Prairie location was destroyed in a July 10, 2018 natural gas explosion in downtown Sun Prairie, and reopened in a new location on 815 W Main St in October 2018. On March 2, 2020, the company opened a store in Rib Mountain, Wisconsin/Wausau, Wisconsin. The new permanent Sun Prairie Wisconsin opened up in March 2022

== Menu ==
The menu serves pasta, pizza, calzones, salads, appetizers, sandwiches, soups, desserts and beverages. Pizzas are available in a hand-tossed style, but may also be ordered thin crust, super thin crust or thick crust. Pizza sizes range from 10" to 16". The best selling pizza is the "Fetalicious," a specialty pizza topped with spinach, red onions, tomatoes, mushrooms and feta cheese. Other notable pizzas include "The Ranch," a pizza that uses ranch dressing instead of the traditional pizza sauce as a base, and "The Thai Pie," which uses peanut sauce as a base. Pizza toppings include the traditional and non-traditional, such as salami, corn, blue cheese and cilantro. Deli sandwiches are made with Boar's Head Deli meats, a selective East Coast deli.

== Environmentalism ==
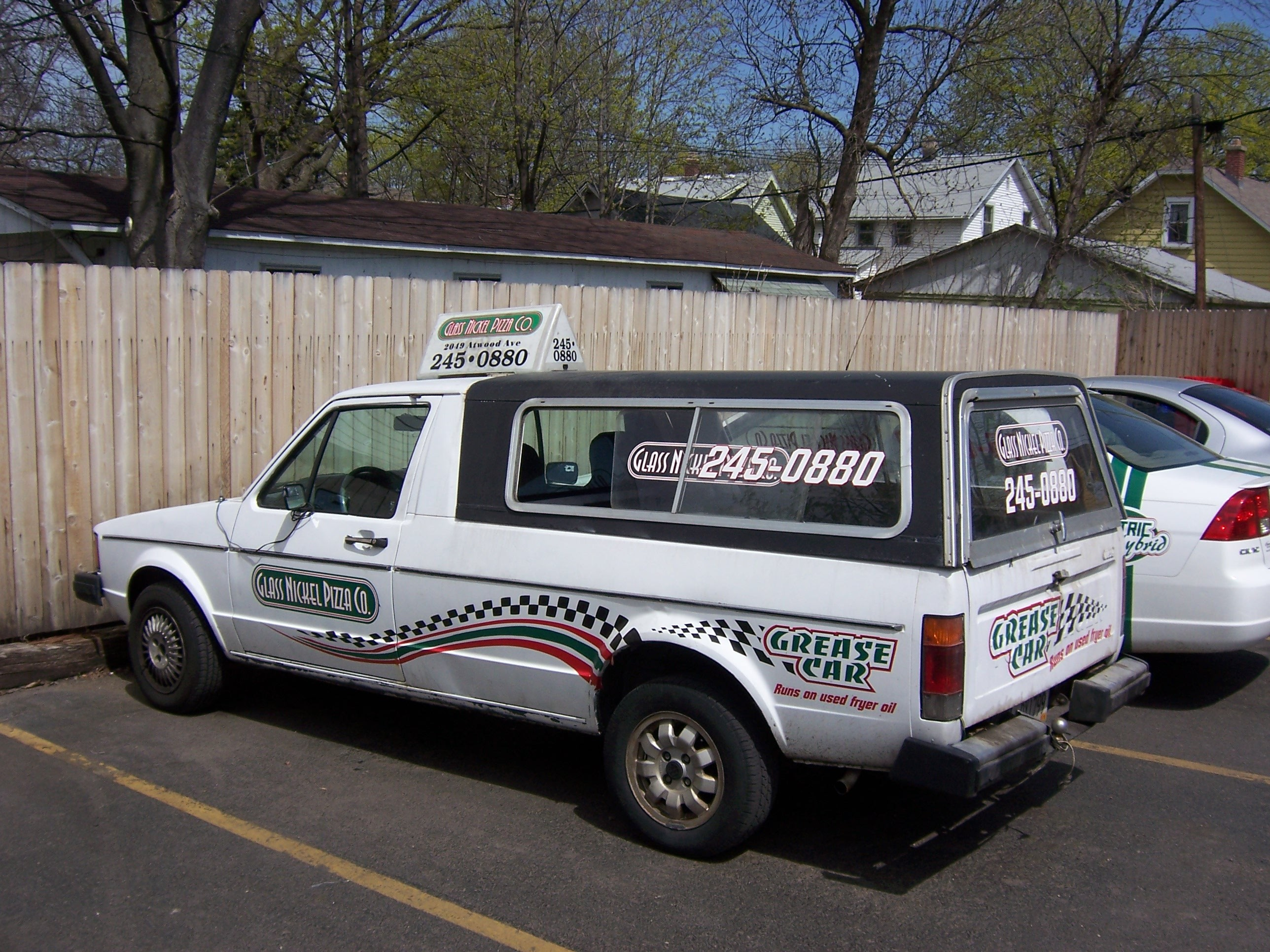
A Glass Nickel "Grease Truck." Honda Hybrid behind Truck

The Glass Nickel is known around Madison for its commitment to environmental sustainability and responsibility. The use of waste vegetable oil (WVO) and hybrid vehicles is unique to delivery restaurants in Madison, and to most delivery systems in America. WVO vehicles are diesel vehicles that have been converted to run off used fryer grease, or other vegetable based oils. The original Glass Nickel has a system in place to automatically convert used fryer oil into fuel for vehicles. Used oil from deep fryers is transported through the building into a filtration room in the restaurant's basement. There, the oil is run through a series of filters and placed in a holding tank until needed for fuel for the delivery fleet. On the outside of the building is a diesel pump that delivery drivers and neighbors use to fill their vehicles. The entire configuration is self-contained within the store. The cars average 45-50 MPG on WVO. Because the oil is made from living plants, any carbon dioxide emissions are a zero addition to the atmosphere, as the plants used for oil—canola, corn, soy, etc.,-- remove the carbon dioxide from the atmosphere. The Glass Nickel also owns and operates two hybrid vehicles in their delivery fleet. New franchisees are required to own and operate at least one Alternative fuel vehicle in their delivery fleet by their third year of operation, be it a WVO Vehicle, hybrid or electric. Furthermore, the store is in the process of converting its interior lighting from fluorescent to L.E.D. light. A new pizza oven shuts off when pizzas are not baking, saving natural gas. Only two of the GN stores currently own and operate these ovens: Fitchburg and the Atwood location. Plans are in the works for a solar array to be constructed atop the restaurant as well.

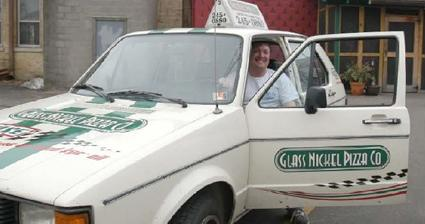
A Glass Nickel "Grease Car." A VW Rabbit

== Awards ==
- Madison's Favorite Pizza - Isthmus Magazine's "Annual Manual" - 9 years in a row (1999–2007)
- Best of Madison - Madison Magazine - 7 years in a row (2001–2007)
- Top 100 Independents - Pizza Today Magazine - #13 currently. 3rd year on the list.
