= Glassile Nurayum Platile Curryum =

Secret group on Facebook launched in 2017

Glassile Nurayum Platile Curryum or GNPC (Translation: "Fizz in the glass and curry on the plate") is a secret group on Facebook launched in Kerala, India on May 1, 2017. This food, drink and travel group also took part in charity activities. The group received widespread attention as a result of the Kerala government crackdown against it for promoting alcohol use and breaking other laws.

== Background ==
The GNPC Facebook group administrator faced allegations and inquiries by the state excise department for promoting alcohol use. Excise commissioner Rishiraj Singh took action on this. Several posts in the group have been accused of promoting alcoholism. The founder admin of the group is T. L. Ajith Kumar,(Ajith) who was arrested for promoting alcohol consumption including displaying the consumption of alcohol in front of children as well as organizing unlicensed parties which served liquor. His wife Vinitha is one of the admins as well. At the time of police action, the group had nearly 1.7 million members and it resulted in the creation of many copycat groups. The excise department and the police cyber cell requested Facebook to remove the group, but this was denied. Though some media outlets had reported that the group had indeed been taken down, it continues to operate under strict moderator oversight.

GNPC is one of the Facebook secret groups with the maximum number of members. It claims to hold the world record for the same as well as for the highest number of comments on a Facebook post. However, there is no official confirmation of this record.
