= 2011 United States listeriosis outbreak =

Disease outbreak in the United States

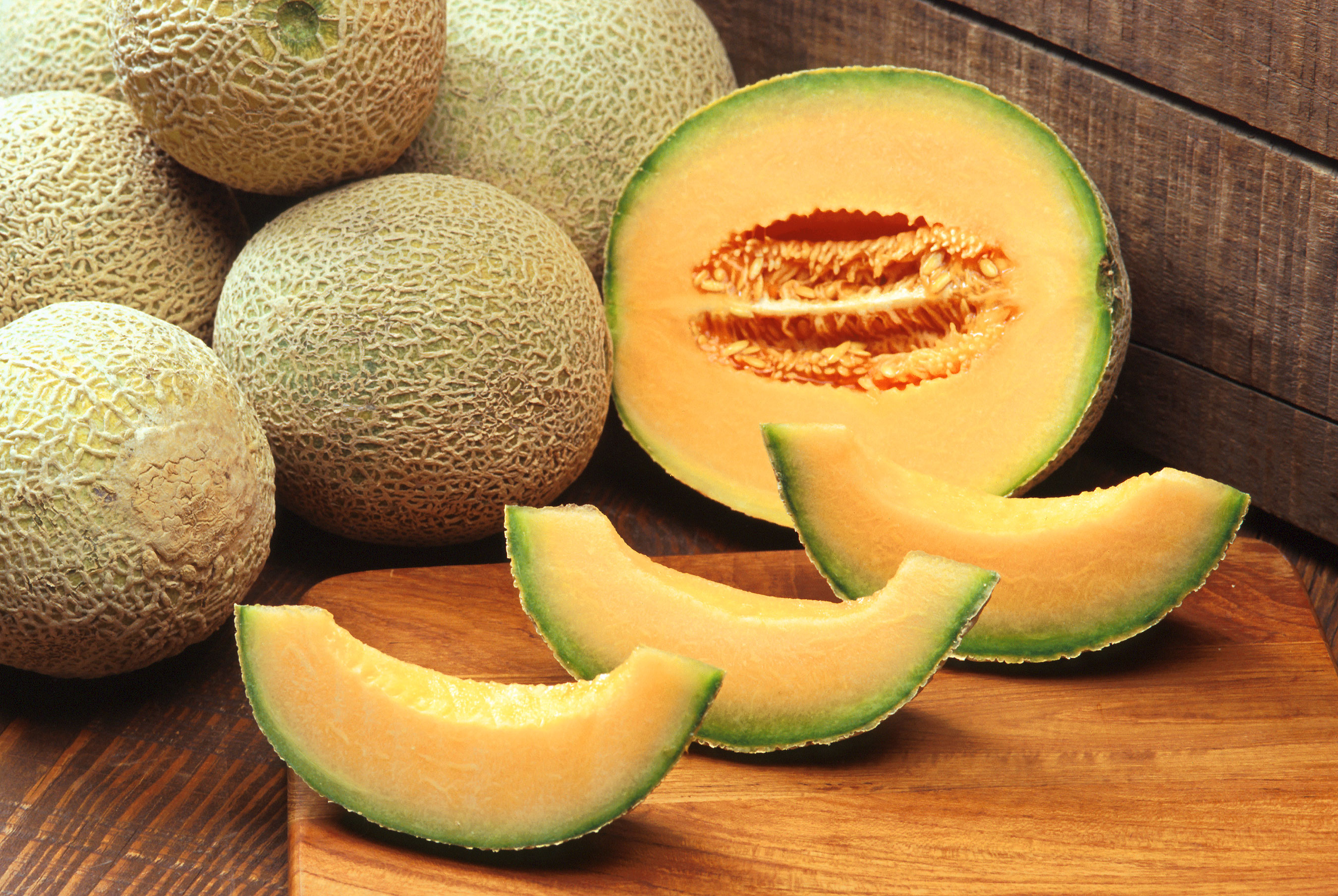
- The outbreak was from cantaloupes from Colorado.
- Date: July 31, 2011 – August 27, 2012
- Location: United States
- Deaths: 33 confirmed
- Injuries: 147 cases confirmed

The 2011 United States listeriosis outbreak was a widespread outbreak of Listeria monocytogenes food poisoning across 28 US states that resulted from contaminated cantaloupes linked to Jensen Farms of Holly, Colorado. As of the final report on August 27, 2012, there were 33 deaths and 147 total confirmed cases since the beginning of the first recorded case on July 31, 2011. It was the worst foodborne illness outbreak in the United States, measured by the number of deaths, since the Centers for Disease Control and Prevention began tracking outbreaks in the 1970s, or tied with the worst, an outbreak of Listeria from cheese in 1985, depending on which CDC report is used. Eric and Ryan Jensen, the brothers who owned Jensen Farms, later pleaded guilty to federal misdemeanor charges related to the outbreak and were sentenced to probation and home detention, in one of the few instances of criminal prosecution stemming from a foodborne illness outbreak in the United States.

== Origin and spread ==
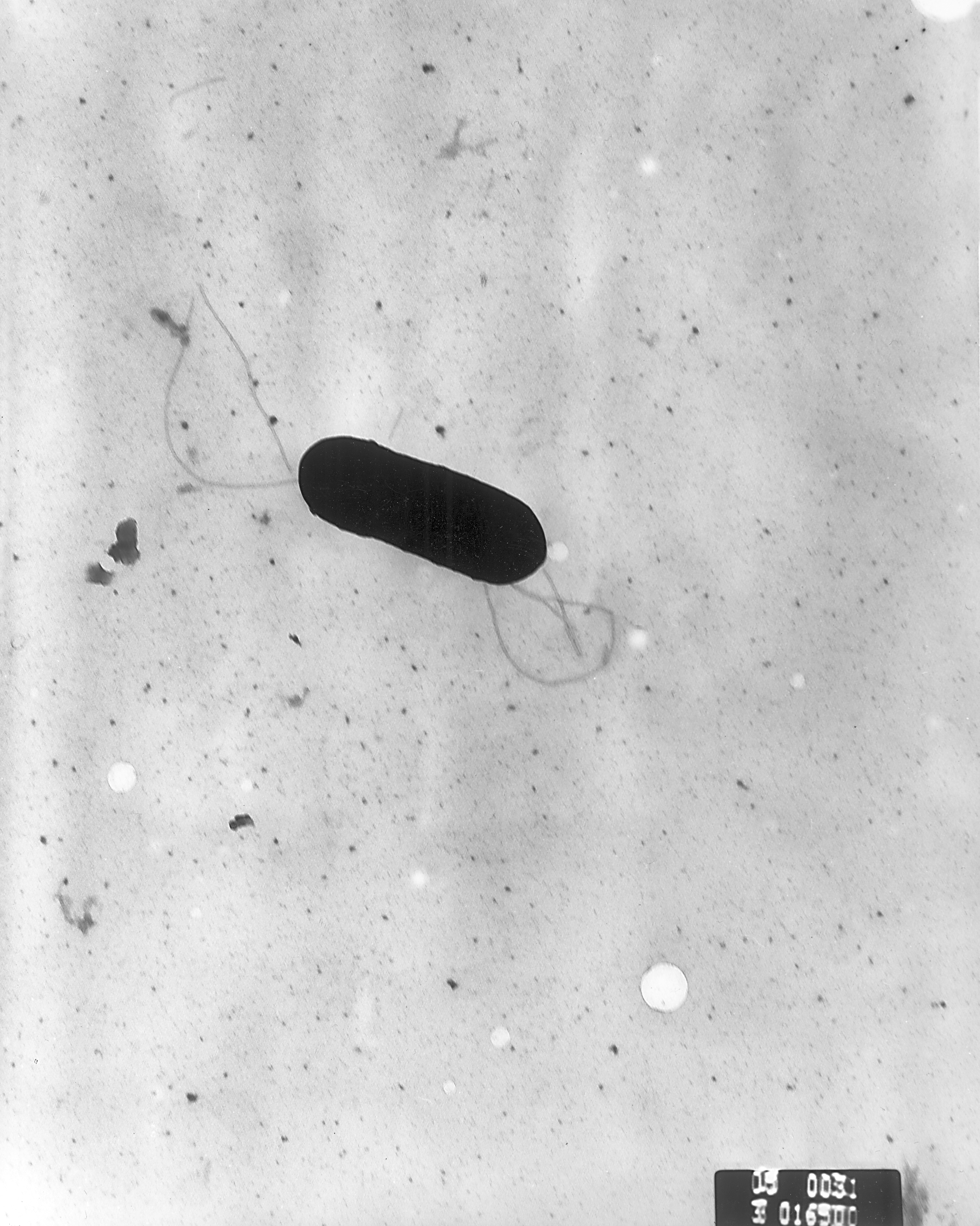
Listeria monocytogenes, the bacterium responsible for listeriosis

Listeriosis is an infection caused by the bacterium Listeria monocytogenes. The outbreak was determined to originate from Jensen Farms in Holly, Colorado after Listeria monocytogenes was found in cantaloupe samples at a Jensen Farms store in Denver, Colorado and at the farm's packaging plant. The batch of cantaloupes had been shipped out over a period from July 29 through September 10 to twenty-five states, including Arkansas, Arizona, California, Colorado, Idaho, Illinois, Kansas, Minnesota, Missouri, Montana, Nebraska, New Jersey, New Mexico, New York, North Dakota, Ohio, Oklahoma, Pennsylvania, South Dakota, Tennessee, Texas, Utah, Virginia, and Wyoming.

The outbreak was first reported by the Centers for Disease Control on September 12, where they stated that "fifteen people in four states had been infected". On September 21, a new report was released by the CDC, bringing the number of deaths to 13 and the number of confirmed cases to 72. The report also stated that further deaths were being investigated to determine if they had also been caused by Listeria infection. The CDC report also stated that, as Listeria "only sickens the elderly, pregnant women and others with compromised immune systems", the median age of all the people that had been infected was 78. On September 30, an update was released by the CDC, reporting that as of 11 am (EDT) Sep 29, 2011 the number of confirmed cases was 84, number of deaths was 15 and the number of states involved was 19. On October 4, the CDC updated their report to 100 infected individuals in 20 states and a total of 18 deaths from the outbreak. The outbreak was shown to have continued to spread to new states, with the CDC update on October 7 stating that the number of cases had risen to 109 in 23 states and that three more people had died to bring the death toll to 21. The CDC update on October 12 put the number of cases at 116 with 23 deaths. An update on October 18 increased the number of cases to 123 and the number of deaths to 25. The October 25 update raised the number of cases to 133, with three more people dying to raise the total to 28. A final update on August 27 confirmed 147 cases and 33 deaths. Fatalities occurred in Colorado (9), Indiana (1), Kansas (3), Louisiana (2), Maryland (1), Missouri (3), Montana (1) Nebraska (1), New Mexico (5), New York (2), Oklahoma (1), Texas (2), and Wyoming (2). Among persons who died, ages ranged from <1 to 96 years, with a median age of 78 years. In addition, one woman pregnant at the time of illness had a miscarriage.

Listeria infections can cause pregnant women to miscarry; the first miscarriage attributed to the 2011 outbreak was reported in early October, in a woman living in Iowa. Pregnant women often are advised to avoid foods, such as unpasteurized cheese and hot dogs, that are known to have the potential to carry Listeria, but fruits such as cantaloupe had not previously been identified as sources of concern.

No list of retailers selling the infected cantaloupes was released by either the government or Jensen Farms. Although the last shipment was September 10 and the fruit had a two-week shelf life, as of September 29, the number of illnesses and deaths were expected to continue rising, because the incubation period could exceed one month.

Recalls by retailers which had sold the Jensen Farms cantaloupes included Kroger (September 15), Safeway (September 15), Aldi (September 16), and US Foods (September 16).

=== FDA investigation ===
An investigation by the Food and Drug Administration (FDA) found that the contaminated cantaloupe harvest contained four separate Listeria monocytogenes strains, which the governmental agency found to be "unusual", but was still trying to determine the reason. On October 20, it was reported that the FDA officials had found Listeria on dirty, corroded equipment used by Jensen Farms, which had been bought used and was previously utilized for potato farming. It was stated by the government that the "equipment's past use may have played a role in the contamination". Water contaminated with Listeria was also found on the floor of the packing plant and it was determined that the workers moving around the plant had spread it, as the contaminated water was also found on the cantaloupe conveyor belt. It was noted by officials that Jensen Farms had "passed a food safety audit by an outside contractor" six days before the outbreak.

How the Listeria bacteria first came to be in the plant remains unknown, as the soil on the farm was determined to be clear of the bacteria. It is suspected, however, that a "dump truck used to take culled melons to a cattle farm...could have brought bacteria to the facility". Furthermore, bacteria growth may have been aided by condensation stemming from the lack of a pre-cooling step to remove field heat from the cantaloupe before cold storage.

=== House Energy and Commerce Committee investigation ===
On October 21, the House Energy and Commerce Committee, a committee panel of the United States House of Representatives, began its own investigation into the outbreak. The Committee "requested a staff briefing from Jensen Farms" and all of the documents they had on the incident. They also requested information from the FDA, CDC, and other governmental groups.

== Jensen Farms response ==
In response to the initial reports by the CDC on the contaminated cantaloupe, Jensen Farms issued a voluntary recall on September 15 of the entire harvest crop of 300,000 cantaloupe that it had distributed to its chain stores. The FDA made the public announcement for the recall after Listeria infection was confirmed by Jensen Farms at its main Colorado branch. Jensen Farms was also forced to temporarily shut down its processing plant while the recall was ongoing. Government officials have been investigating the company's main facility in Colorado to determine if there was "animal or water contamination", but there have been no results from the investigation thus far. Holly, Colorado residents were described as being left "reeling and in fear" because of the disaster for its local producer.

== Political responses ==
The FDA has stated in response to the extensive bacterial outbreak that it is "yet another reason to fully implement the Food Safety Modernization Act." Sherri McGarry, a senior adviser for the FDA, stated that, "We're going to take these lessons learned, share that with our partners and industries, CDC and the states, and what we want to do is we want to really prevent this from happening in the future."

Also, in response to an auditor passing Jensen Farms food safety methods and failing to notice the Listeria bacteria in the plant, the deputy commissioner of foods, Michael R. Taylor, had stated that he intended to "establish standards for how auditors should be trained and how audits should be conducted."

== Criminal Prosecution and Sentencing ==
Criminal prosecution in connection with foodborne illness outbreaks is uncommon; most cases are resolved through civil litigation, regulatory action, or FDA/USDA recalls rather than criminal charges against individuals. The Jensen Farms case was notable for pursuing personal criminal liability against the farm's owners under the "responsible corporate officer" doctrine (derived from the 1975 Supreme Court case United States v. Park), which allows individuals in positions of authority to be held criminally liable for food safety violations under the Federal Food, Drug, and Cosmetic Act without proof of intent or personal negligence.

In September 2013, federal prosecutors charged Eric and Ryan Jensen, the brothers who owned and operated Jensen Farms, with six counts of introducing adulterated food into interstate commerce. They pleaded guilty in October 2013 to misdemeanor versions of the charges, each facing a maximum of six years in prison and $1.5 million in fines.

In January 2014, U.S. Magistrate Judge Michael Hegarty sentenced the brothers to five years of probation, six months of home detention, 100 hours of community service, and $150,000 each in restitution to victims' families. Prosecutors recommended against prison time, citing the brothers' cooperation with investigators; some victims' relatives criticized the sentence as too lenient. The case is frequently cited by legal scholars and food-safety commentators as a rare instance of individual criminal accountability for a foodborne illness outbreak, and contributed to subsequent regulatory reforms shifting federal food-safety enforcement toward contamination prevention.

== Lawsuit ==
On September 15, a lawsuit was filed against Jensen Farms by the first person affected by the contaminated cantaloupe crop, who had fallen ill and been kept in the hospital for several weeks. He and his wife were involved in the legal proceedings. In addition to Jensen Farms, the couple also sued a Walmart branch in Colorado Springs, Colorado, where they had bought the cantaloupe, for selling unsafe food.

== See also ==
- 1985 United States salmonellosis outbreak
- 1992–1993 Jack in the Box E. coli outbreak
- 2008 United States salmonellosis outbreak
- List of foodborne illness outbreaks
