= 1996 Odwalla E. coli outbreak =

Disease outbreak in the United States

- Pathogen: Escherichia coli O157:H7
- Source: Contaminated apple juice sold by Odwalla Inc.
- Location: United States
- First outbreak: Washington state
- First reported: October 30, 1996
- Date: October 7 – November 5, 1996
- Confirmed cases: 70
- Deaths: 1

The 1996 Odwalla E. coli outbreak began on October 7, 1996, when American food company Odwalla produced a batch of unpasteurized apple juice using blemished fruit contaminated with the E. coli bacterium, which ultimately killed a 16-month-old girl and sickened 70 people in California, Colorado, Washington state, and British Columbia, of whom 25 were hospitalized and 14 developed hemolytic uremic syndrome. Odwalla made and marketed unpasteurized fruit juices for the health segment of the juice market.

== History ==
=== Background ===
The Odwalla plant had several food safety issues, many of which arose because Odwalla did not pasteurize its juice. Tests discovered low levels of Listeria monocytogenes, a pathogen that can harm pregnant women, at the Odwalla factory in 1995. In response, the company spent several million dollars on upgrading the plant's safety features, and bacteria were reduced to "relatively low levels".

The next year, Dave Stevenson, Odwalla's technical services director who oversaw quality assurance, suggested to Odwalla executives that the company should add a chlorine rinse to guard against bacteria on the skin of processed fruit, supplementing its existing phosphoric acid wash process. However, this plan was dropped by Chip Bettle, Odwalla's senior vice president, who feared that the chemicals would harm the fruit and alter the flavor of the juice.

In a letter to The New York Times written on January 5, 1998, Odwalla's director of communications, Christopher C. Gallagher, wrote that "Odwalla continuously upgraded its manufacturing process in the period leading up to the recall. Moreover, our primary indicator of overall quality was daily bacteria-level readings, which were relatively low and decreasing in apple juice".

=== Outbreak ===
On October 30, 1996, health officials from the state of Washington informed Odwalla that they had found a link between an outbreak of the E. coli O157:H7 bacterium and a batch of Odwalla's fresh apple juice produced on October 7. This was confirmed on November 5 and may have resulted from using rotten fruit; one account tells of fruit being used that was highly decayed. Another possible source of contamination was fallen apples ("grounders") that had come into contact with animal feces and had not been properly cleaned. Confirmation that the bacteria came from outside the factory was provided when an inspection on November 15 found no evidence of E. coli contamination in the facility. The outbreak came as a surprise as the plant had been inspected by the FDA three months earlier, and Odwalla supervisors were not aware that the E. coli bacteria could grow in acidic, chilled apple juice. Based on a recommendation from the FDA, on October 30, Odwalla's Chief Executive Officer Stephen Williamson voluntarily recalled 13 products which contained apple juice from about 4,600 stores. Carrot and vegetable juices were also recalled the following day as a precautionary measure since they were processed on the same line. The recall cost the company $6.5 million and took around 48 hours to complete, with almost 200 trucks being dispatched to collect the recalled products. Odwalla opened a website and a call center to handle consumer questions about the recall.

As a result of the outbreak, 16-month-old Anna Gimmestad of Greeley, Colorado died from kidney failure, and more than 60 people became sick. Fourteen children were hospitalized with hemolytic-uremic syndrome, a severe kidney and blood disorder, and were, according to doctors, "likely to have permanent kidney damage and other lasting problems". In consequence, Odwalla stock fell by forty percent, and sales of its products dropped by ninety percent. The company laid off 60 workers, and, at the end of the fiscal year, posted a loss of $11.3 million.

=== Aftermath ===
The outbreak occurred because Odwalla sold unpasteurized fruit juices, though pasteurization had long been standard in the juice industry, claiming that pasteurization alters the flavor and destroys at least 30% of nutrients and enzymes in fruit juice. Instead, Odwalla relied on washing usable fruit with sanitizing chemicals before pressing. Because of the lack of pasteurization and numerous other flaws in its safety practices (one contractor warned that Odwalla's citrus processing equipment was poorly maintained and was breeding bacteria in "black rotten crud"), the company was charged with 16 criminal counts of distributing adulterated juice. Odwalla pleaded guilty, and was fined $1.5 million: at the time, the most significant penalty in a food poisoning case in the United States. With the judge's permission, Odwalla donated $250,000 of the $1.5 million to fund research in preventing food-borne illnesses.

William "Bill" Marler represented several children who developed hemolytic-uremic syndrome and suffered severe kidney damage as a result of the outbreak. Most of the claims were resolved in early 2000, and in addition to the fines, the company spent roughly another $12 million settling the lawsuits from the families whose children were infected.

To boost sales following the recall, Odwalla reformulated five products to remove their apple juice content and re-released them in November 1996. Flash pasteurization, as well as several other safety precautions, were introduced to the manufacturing process, and the juices reappeared on store shelves on December 5, 1996.

== Depictions in media ==
- The outbreak was profiled in the fourth-season episode of Forensic Files titled "Core Evidence."
- The outbreak is discussed in a book on Food Safety
