= Atlanta State Farmers' Market =

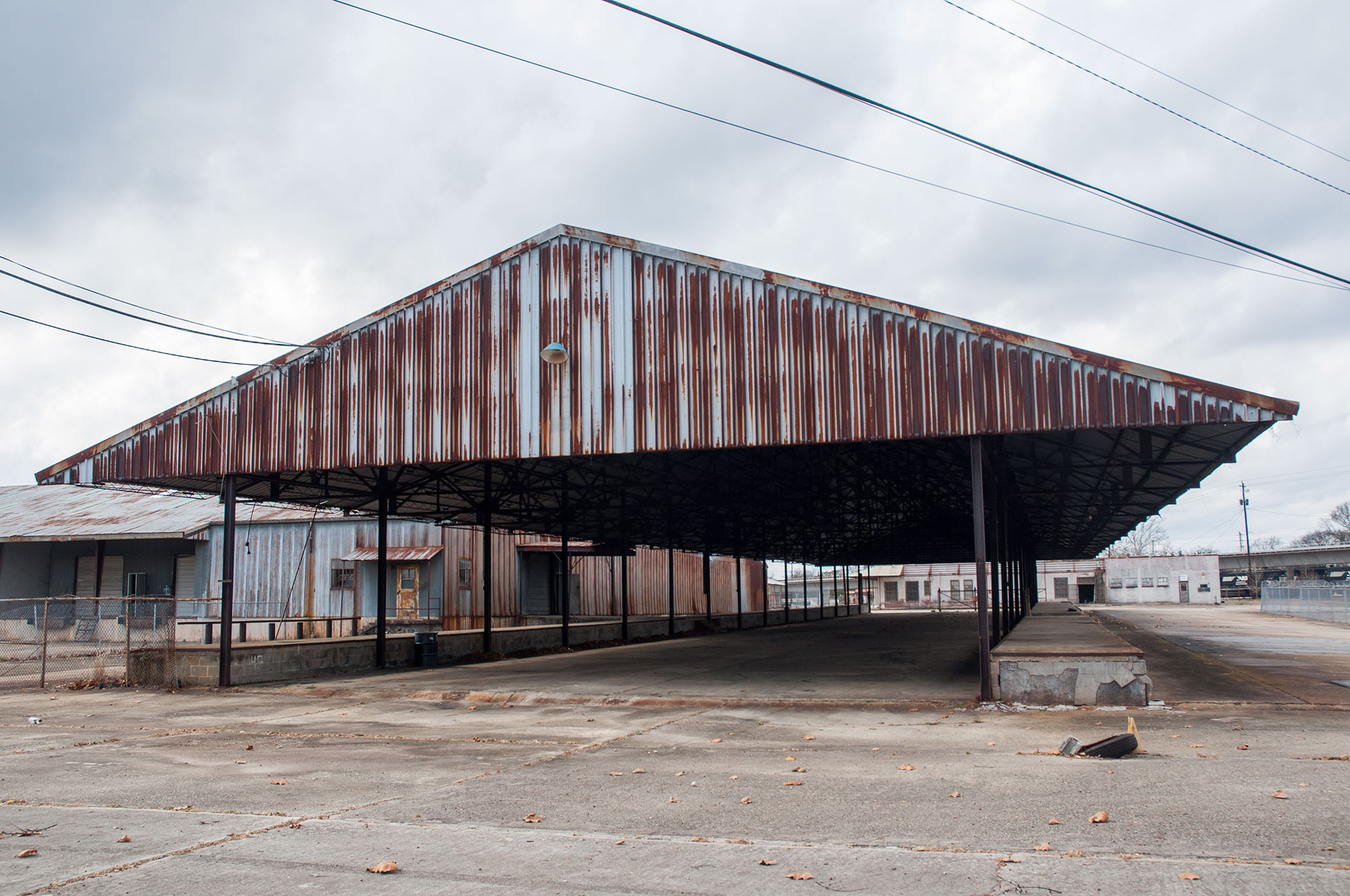
- Atlanta Farmers' Market Shed, 2015

- Location within Atlanta Atlanta State Farmers' Market (Georgia) Atlanta State Farmers' Market (the United States)

General information
- Location: 1050 Murphy Ave SW, Atlanta, Georgia, United States
- Coordinates: 33.726402°N 84.417234°W
- Opened: May 10, 1941

Dimensions
- Other dimensions: 16 acres

Atlanta State Farmers' Market, also known as the Atlanta Farm Market, was located on Murphy Avenue near Sylvan Road, in Atlanta, Georgia. The market was active at this location for 18 years, from 1941 to 1959. Today the market and surrounding industrial buildings are often referred to as the Murphy Triangle. It is listed as an "endangered" property by the Atlanta Preservation Center.

== Courtland Street Market ==
In 1936 a new Atlanta Farmers' Market opened at the intersection of Courtland Street and Gilmer Street, on the site of the old Boys' High School. The market was directly across the street from the Municipal Auditorium (Atlanta). The lease on the land at this location expired at midnight on December 31, 1940.

== Murphy Avenue Market ==
On June 7, 1938 The Atlanta Constitution announced the Georgia State Department of Agriculture was looking to open a new Atlanta Farmers' Market on a 16-acre tract at Murphy Avenue and Sylvan Road. Hamilton Ralls, director of the State Bureau of Markets, proclaimed: "The downtown market is filled to overflowing and we need a central market in Atlanta to take care of the other state markets as well as the overflow." Work on the site did not begin until November 1940 due to strong opposition from nearby homeowners.

The Farmers' Market opened for business on May 10, 1941. The new facility consisted of "six produce buildings, an administrative building and three steel sheds," and was constructed at a cost of $340,000. The buildings and sheds were separated by "wide, concrete drives" that provided access to 117 market units. "The steel sheds [were] used to accommodate farmers who bring their produce in daily." Farmers were charged 50 cents per day for a spot in the sheds. "The produce buildings [held] approximately 110 merchants. Each unit [was] equipped with gas, heat, lights, water, concrete floor and a glass door that can be raised or lowered."

By 1946 the Farmers' Market was already in need of more space. Tom Linder, Commissioner of Agriculture, told The Atlanta Constitution "We need $5,000,000 to build more buildings and provide more space where the big trucks can park to display their goods." Fruit and vegetables came from as far as Mexico and Canada in the off-season to be sold at the market, and "80% of the produce [was] trucked out of state." In 1947 the continued overcrowding of the market resulted in the need for additional policemen to direct traffic during the summer months and a queue of trucks waiting for parking.

== Forest Park ==
A new site was needed for expanding the market, and in 1956 the State of Georgia purchased a 140-acre site along Interstate 75 in Clayton County. The new market would open on January 19, 1958, which marked the closing of the Murphy Avenue Market. The Forest Park location remains an active market which is open to the public.

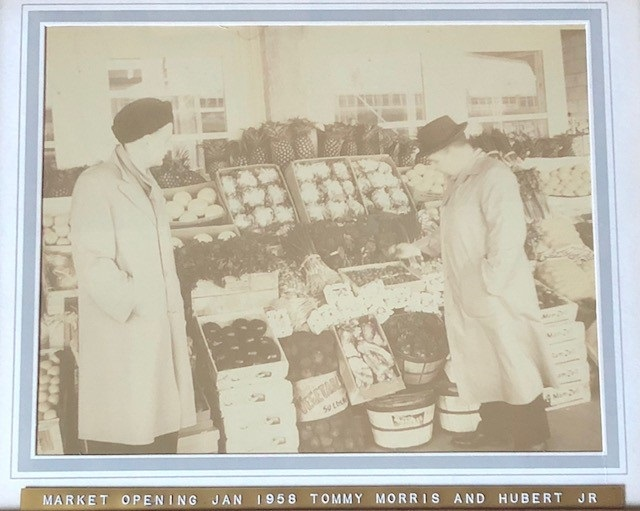
Picture of Brand New opening of the Atlanta State Farmers' Market located in Forest Park, GA in Clayton County. Photo Courtesy of Hubert H. Nall Co., Inc.
