= 2009 United Kingdom E. coli outbreak =

The 2009 E. coli outbreak in the United Kingdom was an outbreak of E. coli in visitors to a farm in Surrey from August to September 2009. 93 people were affected, most of whom were under 10 years of age. Of those affected, 27 were hospitalized and 17 developed hemolytic uremic syndrome.

Investigations by the Health Protection Agency implicated a petting barn at Godstone Farm as a possible source of the outbreak. Fecal samples from several animals in the barn later tested positive for the strain of E. coli in the patients, again indicating that the barn may have been the source of the outbreak. Godstone Farm voluntarily closed the barn in September 2009, after which there were no further cases.
