= 1996 Wishaw E. coli outbreak =

E. coli outbreak in Scotland

The 1996 E. coli outbreak in Wishaw, Scotland, was the deadliest outbreak of Escherichia coli O157:H7 in UK history, leading to 21 deaths and some 100–300 cases of illness from food poisoning. Authorities laid charges against John Barr, a local butcher, who had catered two events linked to the outbreak, but the case against him collapsed in court.

The incident marked a turning point in UK food safety procedures.

== Outbreak ==
At the time of the outbreak, John Barr employed 42 staff across two butcher businesses. He had recently been voted Best Scottish Beef Butcher of the Year.

On 17th November 1996, the John M. Barr and Son butcher shop supplied cooked steaks and gravy for an annual church lunch in Wishaw. 15 cases of food poisoning linked to E. coli were soon recorded. Barr himself was abroad on holiday at the time. John Barr received a visit at his home on the evening of 22nd November from Graham Bryceland, head of protective services at North Lanarkshire Council, Jeffrey Toner, principal environmental health officer for the Council, and Dr. Syed Ahmed, a community medicine specialist. They advised him, but did not order him, to cease supplying cooked meats until tests could take place. Barr agreed to do so; he also stated at this time that he had never heard of E. coli.

The next day, Barr proceeded to cater an eighteenth birthday party with an array of cooked beef, ham and turkey products. More cases of food poisoning were soon confirmed further afield, including in Forth Valley, Greater Glasgow, and Lothian. Within weeks, 303 cases of E. coli were identified, with 10 fatalities among them, with probable connection to meat supplied by Barr.

== Aftermath ==
Barr was charged with culpably, wilfully and recklessly supplying cooked meats. Barr was criticised by Sheriff Principal Graham Cox for failures in staff training, for failing to avoid contamination and for not declaring the full extent of his business.

The case collapsed in October 1997 due to a lack of corroborative evidence, as Bryceland had not kept a sufficient record of his conversations with Barr. Barr was fined £2,250 for two hygiene breaches and for selling contaminated meat.

An enquiry led by bacteriologist Professor Hugh Pennington in 1997 made several key recommendations that changed the approach to food hygiene taken in the UK. Among the changes that followed were the requirement for licensing for butchers premises that handle both cooked and raw meat, and the greater enforcement of the separation of utensils and surfaces used to prepare cooked and raw meat. Pennington also recommended the creation of the Food Standards Agency, which was established in 2000. Pennington made further recommendations following another outbreak of E. coli in South Wales in 2005.
