= Flash pasteurization =

Pasteurization process for liquids

Flash pasteurization, also called "high-temperature short-time" (HTST) processing, is a method of heat pasteurization of perishable beverages like fruit and vegetable juices, beer, wine, and some dairy products such as milk. Compared with other pasteurization processes, it maintains color and flavor better, but some cheeses were found to have varying responses to the process.

Flash pasteurization is performed to kill spoilage microorganisms prior to filling containers, in order to make the products safer and to extend their shelf life compared to the unpasteurised foodstuff. For example, one manufacturer of flash pasteurizing machinery gives shelf life as "in excess of 12 months". It must be used in conjunction with sterile fill technology (similar to aseptic processing) to prevent post-pasteurization contamination.

The liquid moves in a controlled, continuous flow while subjected to temperatures of 71.5 °C (160 °F) to 74 °C (165 °F), for about 15 to 30 seconds, followed by rapid cooling to between 4 °C (39.2 °F) and 5.5 °C (42 °F).

The standard US protocol for flash pasteurization of milk, 71.7 °C (161 °F) for 15 seconds in order to kill Coxiella burnetii (the most heat-resistant pathogen found in raw milk), was introduced in 1933, and results in 5-log reduction (99.999%) or greater reduction in harmful bacteria. An early adopter of pasteurization was Tropicana Products, which has used the method since the 1950s. The juice company Odwalla switched from non-pasteurized to flash-pasteurized juices in 1996 after tainted apple juice containing E. coli O157:H7 sickened many children and killed one.

== See also ==
- Ultra-high-temperature processing
