= 2003 Chi-Chi's hepatitis A outbreak =

Restaurant disease outbreak

Coordinates: 40°37′46″N 75°28′36″W

- Pathogen: Hepatitis A
- Source: Contaminated green onions imported from farms in Mexico
- Location: Monaca, Pennsylvania, U.S.
- First reported: November 3, 2003
- Date: September–December 2003
- Confirmed cases: 650
- Hospitalized cases: 124
- Deaths: 4

In 2003, an outbreak of hepatitis A occurred in northeastern Ohio and southeastern Pennsylvania, United States. The outbreak was caused by contaminated green onions (scallions) at a Chi-Chi's restaurant at Beaver Valley Mall in Monaca, Pennsylvania, approximately 25 miles (40 km) northwest of Pittsburgh, from September to November 2003. The outbreak caused 650 confirmed cases of hepatitis A, of which 124 were hospitalized and four died. The source of the contamination was green onions imported from three farms in Mexico. The Food and Drug Administration (FDA) stated that the contamination occurred during distribution or during growing, harvesting, packing, or cooling the scallions.

== Outbreak ==
On November 3, 2003, the Pennsylvania Department of Health (PDOH) issued a hepatitis A advisory, encouraging anyone who had eaten at the Chi-Chi's restaurant at the Beaver Valley Mall within the past 14 days to receive an immunoglobulin (Ig) shot to prevent becoming ill with the hepatitis A virus. The shot is effective in preventing hepatitis A infection if administered within 14 days of exposure. PDOH scheduled Ig immunization clinics in the metropolitan area over the following days. Approximately 9,000 people were potentially exposed to the hepatitis A outbreak.

The CDC conducted a case-control study to identify menu items or ingredients associated with illness. They identified 181 people as their case patients who dined at the restaurant during the peak exposure period, October 3–6, 2003. Chili con queso and mild salsa were the two menu items found to be associated with the illness. The menu items contained uncooked or minimally heated fresh green onions. Mild salsa was eaten by 94% of the 181 identified case patients. Salsa was prepared in batches and then refrigerated in containers with a shelf life of 3 days. Mild and hot salsas were ladled into bowls and served free with tortilla chips upon seating at the restaurant.

== Infection ==
Hepatitis A is an infectious disease of the liver caused by Hepatitis virus A (HAV). The virus is primarily spread by food contaminated with fecal matter. Hepatitis A can also be contracted from contaminated water, personal contact (such as being in the same household with a person who has the virus or through children at daycare centers), sexual contact, and illicit drug use. The incubation period of hepatitis A is usually 14–28 days.

Green onions require extensive handling during harvesting and during packing preparation. Contamination of green onions could occur through contact with HAV-infected workers, especially children, working in the field during harvesting and preparation, and through HAV-contaminated water during irrigation, rinsing, processing, cooling, and icing.

== Responses ==
Chi-Chi's filed for Chapter 11 bankruptcy protection in October 2003. An order issued in bankruptcy court on February 17, 2004, allowed people affected by the outbreak to attempt to mediate and settle their claims against Chi-Chi's despite the company's bankruptcy status. When the lawsuits were settled, Chi-Chi's had 65 restaurants, fewer than half of the number four years prior. The chain closed its remaining restaurants on the weekend of September 18, 2004.

In November 2003, the FDA issued a consumer alert and an import ban on green onions from four farms in Mexico (including those that supplied green onions to Chi-Chi's). The import ban followed hepatitis A outbreaks in Georgia, Tennessee, and North Carolina in September 2003, a month prior. The restaurant chain removed green onions from its menu altogether.

The Advisory Committee on Immunization Practices (ACIP) updated its guidelines in May 2006 to recommend universal hepatitis A vaccination for all children. The previous recommendation was vaccinating persons in groups shown to be at high risk for infection and children living in communities with high rates of disease.

The outbreak and other E coli outbreaks throughout the early 2000s led to the adoption of the Food Safety Modernization Act in 2011. This gave the FDA new authority to regulate how foods are grown, harvested, and processed.
