= 2005 South Wales E. coli O157 outbreak =

2005 South Wales E. coli O157:H7 outbreak
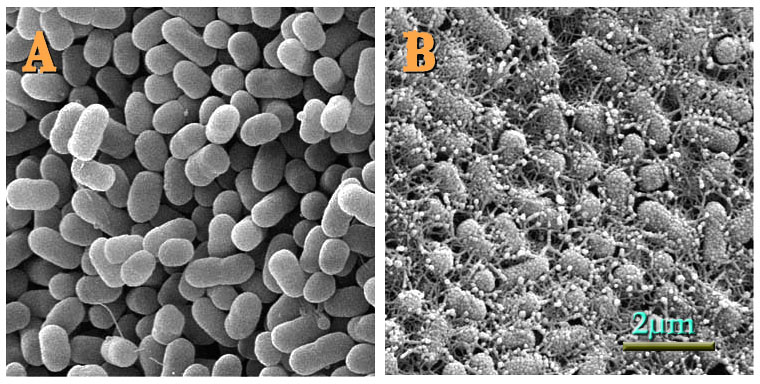
- Two strains of E. coli O157:H7
- Pathogen: Escherichia coli O157:H7
- Source: Contaminated vacuum packing machine
- Location: South Wales, United Kingdom
- First outbreak: Merthyr Tydfil
- First reported: 16 September 2005
- Date: 10 September – 8 November 2005
- Confirmed cases: 157
- Severe cases: 31
- Deaths: 1

An outbreak of the Escherichia coli O157 bacterium occurred in South Wales in 2005. It was the largest outbreak of E. coli O157 in Wales and the second largest in the UK. 157 cases were identified in the outbreak; 31 people were hospitalized, and there was a single fatality. Most of the 157 cases identified were children, attending 44 different schools across four different local authorities – Bridgend, Merthyr Tydfil, Caerphily and Rhondda Cynon Taf. Of those infected, 109 cases were identified as a strain of E. coli O157 unique to this outbreak.

The first cases were identified on 16 September 2005, after 5 children were admitted to a hospital in Merthyr Tydfil. The earliest sign of illness had been 10 September. Most cases had originated before the end of September, though the last case of the outbreak was identified on 8 November 2005.

For many of those affected, the illness progressed with a typical process of vomiting and bloody diarrhoea, sometimes leading to kidney failure. Afterwards, some of those affected spoke of long-lasting physical and psychological effects.

The cause was a vacuum packing machine used to package both raw meat and cooked meat without being properly cleaned between batches, resulting in cross-contamination.

== Fatality ==
A consequence of the E. coli outbreak was the death of a five-year-old named Mason Jones from Deri, Caerphilly. He had attended his local primary school and contracted the disease via a meal served at the school. He was sent home from school on Wednesday 21 September feeling ill, shortly after his elder brother had recovered from the same illness. His condition gradually worsened over the next few days. The out-of-hours health service did not react immediately to his worsening condition, but he was admitted to hospital on Sunday 25 September, where he was diagnosed with kidney failure and transferred to a specialist unit in Bristol on Monday 26 September. Despite intensive care, Mason died on Tuesday 4 October.

Since his death, his mother, Sharon Mills, has campaigned to help raise awareness of the dangers of E. coli O157. In a statement to the press, she said "I just want people to know how bad this bacterium is, and how powerless I felt standing by the side of him watching him die from it".

A memorial garden was established in at his primary school in Deri.

== Source of the outbreak ==
The source of the outbreak was traced to meat supplied by a butcher at Bridgend – John Tudor & Son, the proprietor of which was William Tudor. The infected meat had originated at the abattoir of William Tudor's cousin, JE. Tudor & Sons ltd. Despite several warnings by food hygiene inspectors, William Tudor continued to be awarded contracts to supply meat to local schools for school meals. He had falsified records that were an important part of food safety practice and had lied to environmental health officers. In the Public Inquiry Report, Professor Hugh Pennington said "the blame for the outbreak rests squarely on the shoulders of William Tudor".

Despite the death of Mason Jones, the Crown Prosecution Service decided against seeking a conviction for manslaughter, and William Tudor was eventually convicted after pleading guilty to 7 food hygiene offences and was sentenced to one year in prison. He was released after serving 12 weeks of that sentence.

== Public Inquiry ==
The Public Inquiry into the outbreak was led by Professor Hugh Pennington, who had also presided over the Inquiry into the Lanarkshire outbreak in 1996. The report was published on 19 March 2009.

The Public Inquiry included more than 45,000 pages of evidence, 258 statements from 191 witnesses, and 63 witnesses were called to the hearing. It cost £2.3 million. William Tudor did not cooperate with the inquiry, though was not compelled to do so.

The report made 24 recommendations, 15 relating to food hygiene inspections; some of these were aimed at strengthening key HACCP (Hazard Analysis Critical Control Points) principles and for the Food Standards Agency to review its guidance. It also recommended a substantial review of food hygiene by local authorities in five years (thus 2014).

The report contained criticisms of several local administrations and food hygiene inspection procedures. Bridgend County Borough Council was ultimately responsible for the inspection of John Tudor & Son. Criticism was also levelled at Rhondda Cynon Taf, Bridgend, Caerphilly and Merthyr Tydfil County Borough Councils who had awarded the schools contracts to John Tudor & Sons, calling the process by which the contracts were awarded as "seriously flawed". Criticism was also levelled at the Meat Hygiene Service which had failed to enforce Meat Hygiene Regulations at the JE Tudor & Sons abattoir.

There was also criticism of the communication procedures of the out-of-hours healthcare service.

The Outbreak Control Team was praised for controlling the outbreak, identifying the source and removing cooked meats from the food chain.

At the press conference at the publication of the Inquiry Report:

"E. coli O157 is a particularly nasty organism but it can be prevented from causing infection. It has not gone away; it remains a potential threat to people's health. There are no specific treatments available to prevent the onset of complications which are often severe and sometimes fatal. Prevention is paramount. Steps must be taken at points throughout the food chain to prevent contamination and cross-contamination, particularly in abattoirs and butchers' premises that handle raw and cooked meats. The report has reinforced our belief that William Tudor is responsible for Mason's death. I believe the inspections regimes clearly should be tightened. There is no excuse for the serious failings which occurred, which ultimately led to the E. coli outbreak. I am pleased with Professor Pennington's recommendations. I am now to go away and digest the report thoroughly. The Professor has studied the evidence that has been gathered during the course of the Inquiry and has returned with very sensible recommendations. We thank him for his time and efforts. Abattoirs' reliance on self-regulation leads to business owners cutting corners, which is what led to the tragedy such as the E. coli outbreak. I agree that all businesses that are dealing with raw and cooked meats need to have in place an effective and working asset plan.

Professor Pennington has come to the conclusion that William Tudor is to blame for the E. coli outbreak that killed our 5-year-old son and we now look to move on to the Inquest into our son's death where we hope the coroner will reach an appropriate verdict.

On Mothers Day 2014 I do not want to be standing here sympathising with another family that has lost a child to E. coli O157."
