= Boar's Head Provision Company =

American meat and cheese supplier

- Trade name: Boar's Head Brand
- Type: Private
- Industry: Delicatessen meats and cheeses
- Founded: 1905; 121 years ago, in Brooklyn, New York
- Founder: Frank Brunckhorst
- Headquarters: Sarasota, Florida, United States
- Area served: United States, Dominican Republic, Panama, Mexico
- Key people: Robert S. Martin (Co-chief executive); Carlos Giraldo (President); Steve Kourelakos (Chief financial officer)
- Products: Franks, deli meat, cheeses, hummus, condiments, soups, pickles
- Revenue: $3 billion
- Owner: Brunckhorst family; Bischoff family
- Website: boarshead.com

Boar's Head Provision Co., Inc. (also Boar's Head Brand, or Frank Brunckhorst Co., LLC) is a supplier of cold-cut meats (turkey, ham, beef, bologna), franks, sausages, bacon, cheeses, charcuterie, hummus, dips, spreads, olives, pickles, and condiments. The company was founded in 1905 in Brooklyn, New York, and now distributes its products throughout the United States. It has been based in Sarasota, Florida, since 2001.

The company is not publicly traded. Shares are closely held by the founder's descendants.

== History ==
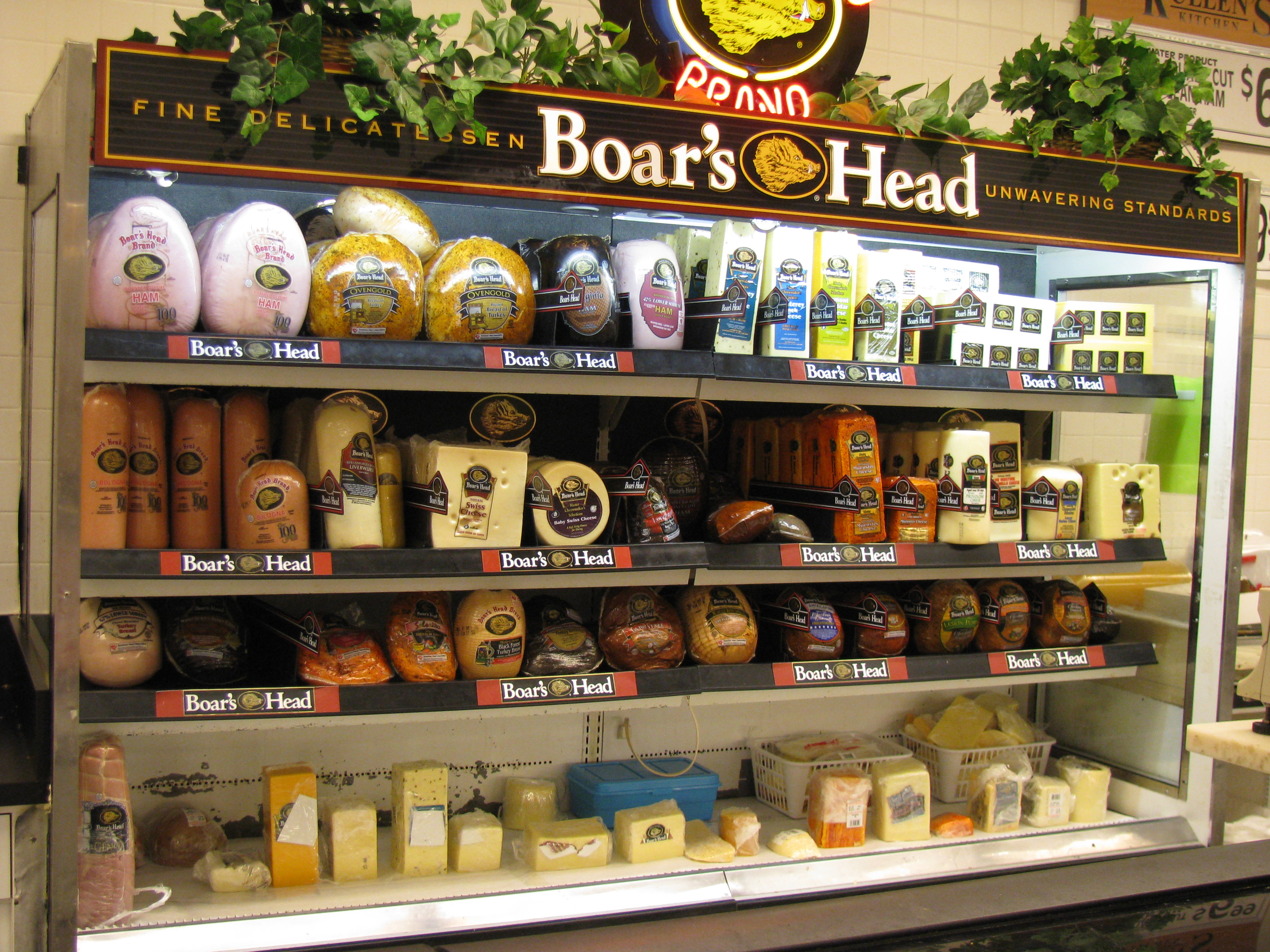
A display of Boar's Head meats and cheeses, taken at a King Kullen deli

Frank Brunckhorst began distributing cold cuts and hot dogs under the Boar's Head name in 1905. By 1933, distribution of Boar's Head products had grown, and Brunckhorst and his partners, Bruno Bischoff and Theodore Weiler, decided to open a manufacturing plant. The first plant was started in a small building in Brooklyn with three employees.

Brunckhorst's son (also Frank Brunckhorst) took over the business; Frank Brunckhorst II died in 1972 at age 65. During the 1990s, the expanding company added processing plants in Virginia, Arkansas, and Michigan, and it began to shift its strategy toward its current business model that stresses exclusive relationships with supermarket chains. In 2001, the company moved its headquarters from Brooklyn to Sarasota, Florida, in part because of a close three-decade-long partnership with Publix, which is based in nearby Lakeland.

For many years, the voice-over in Boar's Head commercials was supplied by the voice performer Joseph Sirola. In 2008, the company opened an "experimental" retail outlet in Brooklyn, which closed the following year.

=== Fatalities linked to products ===
With an initial reported case of illness on May 29, 2024, the U.S. Centers for Disease Control and Prevention (CDC) determined that a listeriosis outbreak could be traced to Boar's Heads products, linked to 10 deaths and 59 hospitalizations as of September 25, 2024. Unreported illnesses may have accounted for higher actual incidents of illness. This represented the largest listeriosis outbreak on record since 2011. The company immediately recalled a large selection of products. In July 2024, the company issued a recall on over 7 million pounds of its products produced at a plant in Greensville County, Virginia, near the town of Jarratt. On September 13, 2024, Boar's Head announced that they would close the Jarratt plant indefinitely and discontinue sales of liverwurst permanently.

Ongoing monthly inspections from August 2023 through July 2024 at the Jarratt plant reported black mold, surfaces contaminated with "meat over-spray", and an unknown substance dripping from the ceiling. The Food Safety and Inspection Service had observed multiple noncompliance findings every month from August 2023 through July 2024 in a 44-page report. Noncompliance was found in operations, labeling, and sanitation performance standards.

Multiple lawsuits were filed against Boar's Head following the listeria outbreak alleging a wide range of complaints from false advertising to wrongful death.

In January 2025, the USDA released inspection records that revealed unsanitary conditions at several Boar's Head deli meat plants, including one in Petersburg, Virginia. According to news reports, there were similar problems at the plants as there were in Jarratt, including equipment covered in meat scraps. The Petersburg facility was cited for noncompliance multiple times by the USDA, most recently in August 2025. An inspector wrote that “the establishment continues to fail to prevent product from becoming adulterated or contaminated.”

In November 2025, Boar's Head voluntarily recalled thousands of units of pecorino romano cheese after testing positive for listeria.
