= Odwalla =

American food product company

Odwalla Inc.
- Type: Subsidiary
- Industry: Consumer products
- Founded: 1980; 46 years ago, in Santa Cruz, California, U.S.
- Founder: Greg Andrew Steltenpohl; Gerry Keith Percy; Jeannine Bonstelle (Bonnie) Bassett
- Headquarters: Half Moon Bay, California, U.S.
- Area served: United States
- Key people: Steven M. McCormick (COO and general manager); James R. Steichen (SVP Finance and CFO); Chris Brandt (director brand)
- Products: Drinks, food bars
- Revenue: US$187.9 million (2007)
- Number of employees: 900
- Parent: Full Sail IP Partners
- Website: www.odwalla.com

Odwalla Inc. (/oʊˈdwɔːlə/) is an American health food company based in Dinuba, California. Founded in Santa Cruz, California, in 1980 and formerly headquartered in Half Moon Bay, California, from 1995 to 2013, the company's product lines included fruit juices, smoothies, soy milk, bottled water, organic beverages, and several types of energy bars known as "food bars".

The company experienced strong growth after its incorporation in 1985, expanding its distribution network from California to most of North America, and went public in 1993.

Odwalla juice caused a fatal outbreak of E. coli O157:H7 in 1996 because of numerous flaws in its safety practices, for which the company was found criminally liable. Despite industry norms, Odwalla originally sold unpasteurized juices, to avoid altering the flavor of its juices. Following the E. coli (Escherichia coli) outbreak and the death of at least one child, Odwalla adopted flash pasteurization and other sanitization procedures. Odwalla recalled its juices and experienced a 90% reduction in sales following the event. The company gradually recovered and, the following year, became profitable again.

In 2001, Odwalla was acquired by the Coca-Cola Company for US$181 million and became a wholly owned subsidiary. In July 2020, Coca-Cola announced it would discontinue the Odwalla brand by August 2020.

The brand was sold to Full Sail IP Partners in 2021.

In January 2025, Mexican beverage company Grupo Jumex began a partnership with Full Sail IP Partners and relaunched the brand. Odwalla is now distributed by Vilore Foods Company, Inc. of San Antonio, Texas, with juices manufactured in Mexico.

== History ==
=== Origin ===
Odwalla was founded in Santa Cruz, California, in 1980 by Greg Steltenpohl, Gerry Percy, and Bonnie Bassett. Odwalla's production facility is in Dinuba, California. The trio took the idea of selling fruit juices from a business guidebook, and they began by squeezing orange juice with a secondhand juicer in a shed in Steltenpohl's backyard. They sold their product from the back of a Volkswagen van to local restaurants, employing slogans such as "soil to soul, people to planet and nourishing the body whole".

The name for their start-up, "Odwalla", was taken from that of a character who guided "the people of the sun" out of the "gray haze" in the song-poem "Illistrum", a favorite of the founders, which was composed by Roscoe Mitchell and performed by the Art Ensemble of Chicago jazz group, of which Mitchell was a member. Steltenpohl, Percy, and Bassett related this to their products, which they believe "help humans break free from the dull mass of over-processed foods so prevalent today".

=== Incorporation to 1996 ===
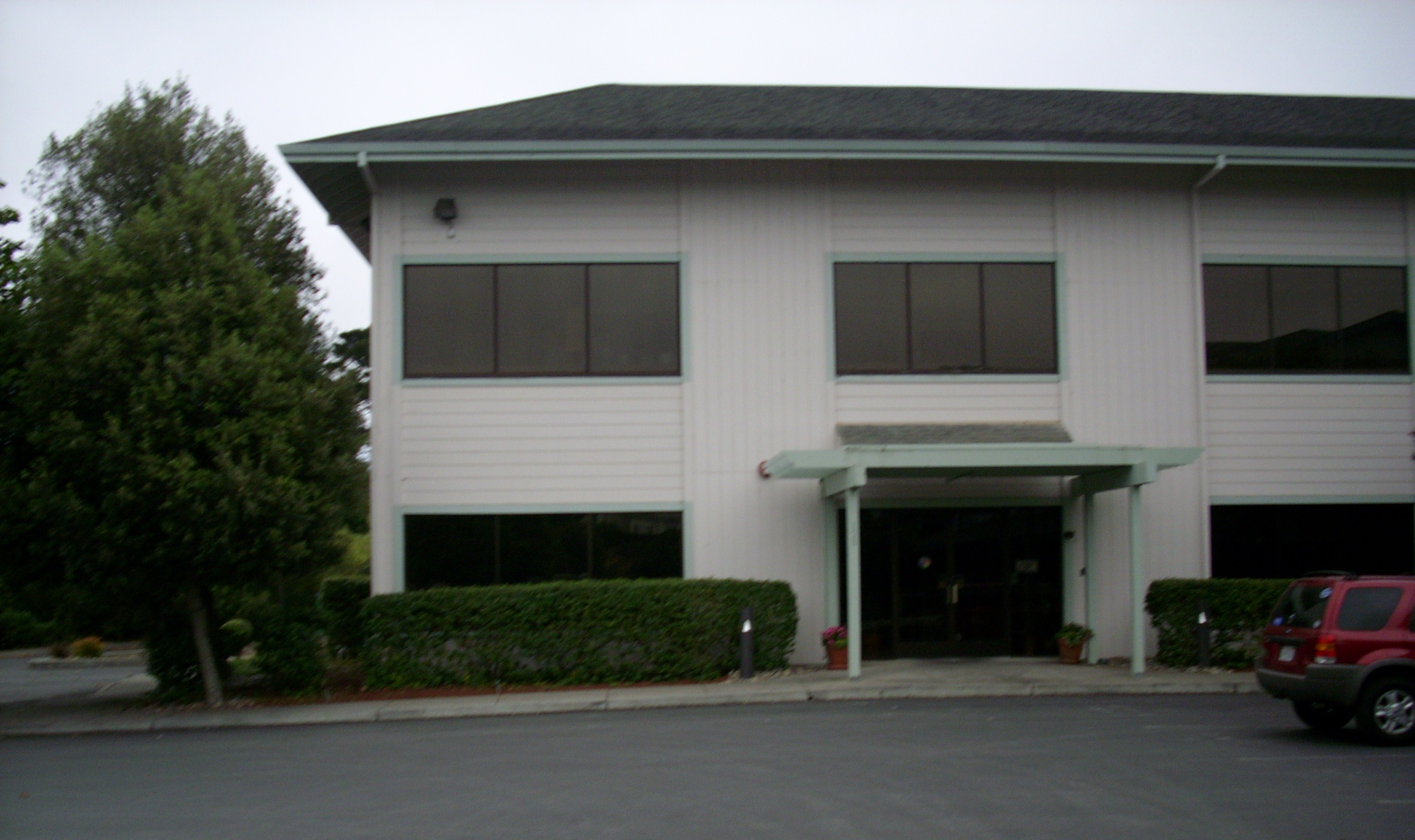
The former headquarters of Odwalla Inc. in Half Moon Bay, California

Odwalla was incorporated in September 1985 after five years of growth and expanded to sell products in San Francisco in 1988. Hambrecht & Quist Inc., a venture capital firm in San Francisco, was one of Odwalla's main investors at the time, investing several million dollars in the company. By 1992, the company employed 80 people at its company headquarters in Davenport, California, and sold around 20 different flavors of juice for between $1.50 and $2.00 a pint. Odwalla went public in December 1993 (NASDAQ:ODWA); the company had 35 delivery trucks, almost 200 employees, and made about $13 million a year. Soon afterwards, Odwalla expanded into new markets when it bought two companies in the Pacific Northwest and Colorado.

Odwalla built a new production facility located in Dinuba, California, in 1994 in order to better meet production demands. The following year, the company moved its headquarters to Half Moon Bay, California.

Continual growth and outside investments during these years allowed the company to expand and grow: Odwalla's revenue tripled from 1994 to 1995, and in 1996 they made more than $59 million in sales, their highest ever. This constant growth made Odwalla one of the largest fresh-juice companies in America by 1996, when the company was selling its products to stores in seven states and parts of Canada. It was estimated that they would reach $100 million in sales by 1999. Much of this growth resulted from the perception that Odwalla's products were healthier than regular juice because they were not pasteurized.

=== 1997–2001 ===
On October 7, 1996, Odwalla made a batch of apple juice using blemished fruit contaminated with E. coli resulting in one death and 66 sickened customers. The outbreak occurred because Odwalla sold unpasteurized fruit juices, though pasteurization had long been standard in the juice industry, claiming that pasteurization alters the flavor and destroys nutrients. Because of the lack of pasteurization and numerous other flaws in its safety practices, the company was charged with 16 criminal counts of distributing adulterated juice. Odwalla pleaded guilty, and was fined $1.5 million: at the time, the most significant penalty in a food poisoning case in the United States.

A bottle of Odwalla Future Shake

Despite a net loss for most of 1997, Odwalla worked to rehabilitate its brand name. In addition to advertising its new safety procedures, Odwalla released its line of food bars (its first solid food product line) and entered the $900 million fruit bar market. Another new product was the Future Shake, a "liquid lunch" aimed at younger consumers. Because of these efforts, Odwalla was again profitable by the end of 1997, reporting a profit of $140,000 for the third quarter.

Having recovered, the company worked to expand geographically into markets like Philadelphia and Washington, D.C., and by the end of 1998 reported that revenue had surpassed pre-crisis levels. Growth continued over subsequent years, in part through the $29 million acquisition of Fresh Samantha, a large juice company based in Saco, Maine, in 2000. This allowed Odwalla to expand into additional East Coast markets, but incurred high transportation costs as products had to be shipped across the United States from California. To address this problem the company announced plans to build a second production facility in Palm Beach County, Florida. However, facing difficulties in obtaining building permits and allocating sufficient funds, the project was first delayed and eventually cancelled. Odwalla produced and sold products under both its own and the Fresh Samantha brand names for a few years; however, in 2003, the company decided to stop selling juice under the Fresh Samantha name and to only sell Odwalla-brand juice.

=== 2001–2020 ===
Odwalla was purchased by The Coca-Cola Company in 2001 for $15.25 a share, a deal which totalled $181 million and was unanimously approved by the Odwalla board of directors. Under the terms of the merger, Odwalla's management stayed on as heads of the company, and it was "folded" into Coca-Cola's Minute Maid department. The acquisition was one of several similar mergers which were aimed at expanding Coca-Cola's product line to include non-carbonated drinks. Odwalla benefited by obtaining up to a 124.3 percent premium on shares of the company, as well as from the stability and strength that ownership by The Coca-Cola Company offered. Odwalla also was able to expand into new markets because of Coca-Cola's well-established distribution network.

Odwalla continued to grow following the acquisition. This growth resulted in part from new product releases, which included a line of PomaGrand pomegranate juice (released at the 2006 Sundance Film Festival), two flavors of energy drinks, and three flavors of "Soy Smart" drinks, which contain soy protein, omega-3 fatty acids, and calcium.

Coca-Cola promoted Odwalla products in 2006 when the company aimed at removing carbonated soda products in schools. Odwalla continued to have good growth in 2007, when Coca-Cola, squeezed by poor growth in its North American markets, issued a company-wide hiring freeze; Odwalla, because of its good performance, was one of the few exceptions to the rule.

=== 2020–present ===
In July 2020, Coca-Cola announced the permanent discontinuation of all Odwalla products, due to the COVID-19 pandemic and the brand not having shown growth in three consecutive years (a subset of the corporation's which comprise less than 2% of its total revenue). Coca-Cola sold the brand to Full Sail IP Partners in 2021. Its headquarters was relocated to its production facility in Dinuba, California, some time in the early 2020s.

In January 2025, Mexican beverage company Jumex announced a partnership with Full Sail IP Partners in which Jumex would handle manufacturing. The brand was relaunched that year. Odwalla is now distributed by Vilore Foods Company, Inc. of San Antonio, Texas, with juices manufactured in Mexico.

== Production ==
A refrigerated Odwalla display case at a grocery store; Odwalla used these cases to increase its products' visibility.

Odwalla used what it characterized as "fresh-sourced" produce (fruits and vegetables that had recently been harvested) to make many of its products, as well as organic oats for food bars and certain tropical fruits in a frozen purée form, purchased from an outside source and blended with fruit juice. Because Odwalla used fresh produce, some juices were seasonal. Fruit availability and price were also affected by adverse weather, disease, and natural disasters. Throughout the year, Odwalla juice colors and flavors changed slightly because different types of fruit were used.

After the E. coli outbreak, Odwalla improved the safety of several of its production processes. Before the fruit entered the factory, it was washed, sorted and sanitized. Once it reached the plant, the apples, carrots, and citrus fruits were separated and washed again. The fruit was pressed to get the juice, which was then flash pasteurized and bottled. A sample underwent quality testing, and, if it passed, the batch was shipped in refrigerated trucks to various distribution centers in the United States. Odwalla juice had a relatively short shelf life compared to other beverages and thus required refrigeration. However, the shelf life was considerably extended after the introduction of flash pasteurization in 1996 and a new plastic bottle in 2001. Generally, Odwalla products were sold in special Odwalla-brand displays at grocery and convenience stores, instead of being intermixed with other products.

== Products ==
=== Drinks ===
Odwalla Inc. produced many flavors of fruit and vegetable drinks, as well as dairy-free soy milk (marketed under the "Soy Smart" name), "PomaGrand" pomegranate juice, "Serious Energy" caffeinated fruit juice, bottled spring water, and Odwalla's Superfood smoothie line of products (see green smoothie), which are viewed as the core products of the company and are made of various fruit purées, wheat grass, and barley grass. These products accounted for roughly 95 percent of Odwalla's revenue in 2001. Odwalla juice was sold in individual 12 fl oz (formerly 450 millilitre or 15.4 US fl oz) bottles made of plant-based recyclable HDPE plastic, as well as larger 64 US fluid ounce (1.9 litre) containers. Odwalla's juice, because of production costs, was "typically sold at prices higher than most other juice products", and the price of the juice could vary over time because of weather or disease affecting the supply of fruit and vegetables.

Odwalla's sugar content could be even higher than Coca-Cola's. For example, Odwalla's "Mango Tango" had 3.67 grams of sugar per ounce—almost 1 full teaspoon of sugar in every ounce of juice. Coca-Cola contains 3.25 grams of sugar per ounce. This translates to 44 grams of sugar (nearly four tablespoons) in a 12-ounce "Mango Tango" versus 39 grams of sugar in a 12-ounce Coke.

Throughout its history, Odwalla produced and subsequently withdrew various juice flavors due to their lower popularity, including the Odwalla Superfood Amazing Purple, Soy Vanilla, and Pomegranate Mango drinks.

=== Food bars ===
A box of Banana Nut bars and two Chocolate Chip Protein bars

In September 1998, Odwalla began to sell energy bars made with fruit and grains, called food bars, as an alternative to its drinks in an attempt to raise revenue following the 1996 E. coli outbreak. The first three flavors released were Cranberry Citrus, Organic Carrot & Raisin, and Peach Crunch. Within eight weeks of their release, the Odwalla Bar was one of the top-selling energy bar brands in the market. The bars came in a variety of flavors, and weighed 2 ounces (57 grams) per bar. As of 2001, before Odwalla was acquired by Coca-Cola, food bars accounted for less than five percent of Odwalla's revenue.

== See also ==
- List of food companies
