= July 1971 =

Month of 1971

<<	July 1971					>>
Su	Mo	Tu	We	Th	Fr	Sa
				1	2	3
4	5	6	7	8	9	10
11	12	13	14	15	16	17
18	19	20	21	22	23	24
25	26	27	28	29	30	31

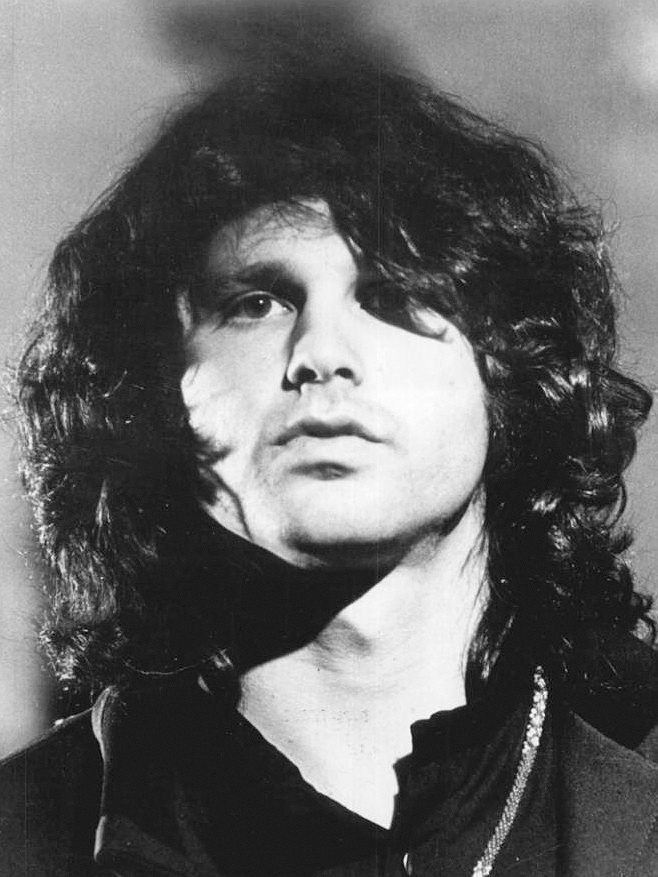
July 3, 1971: Rock legend Jim Morrison dies at 27 years old

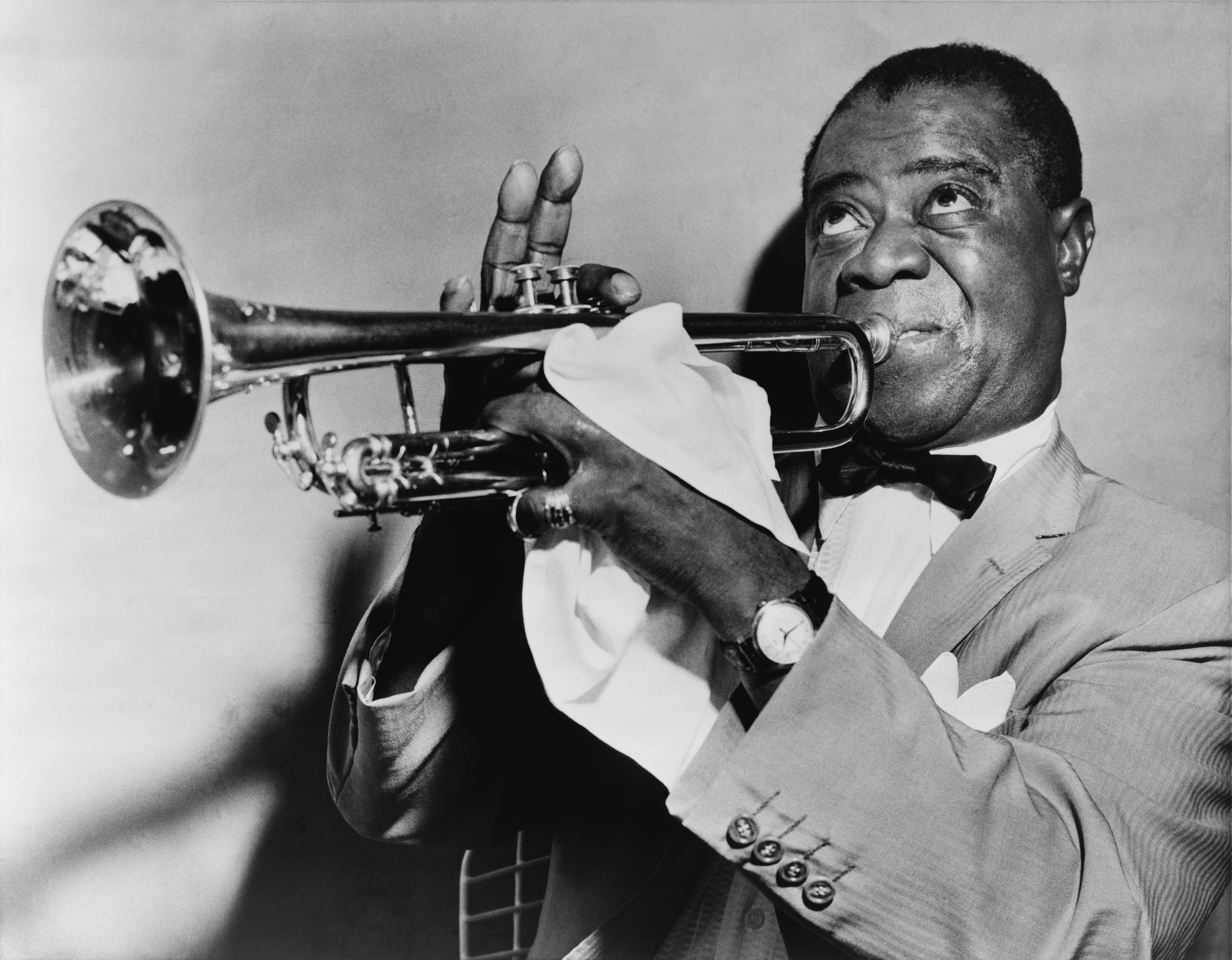
July 6, 1971: Jazz legend Louis Armstrong dies at 69 years old

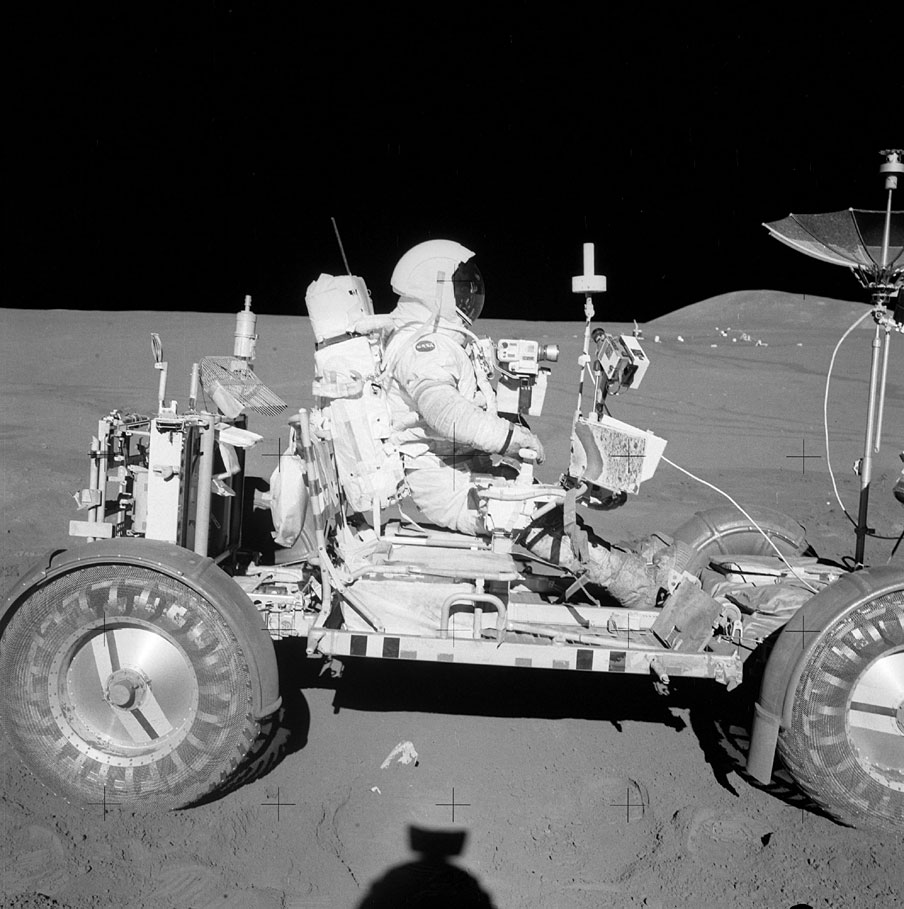
July 31, 1971: U.S. astronaut David R. Scott becomes first driver on the Moon

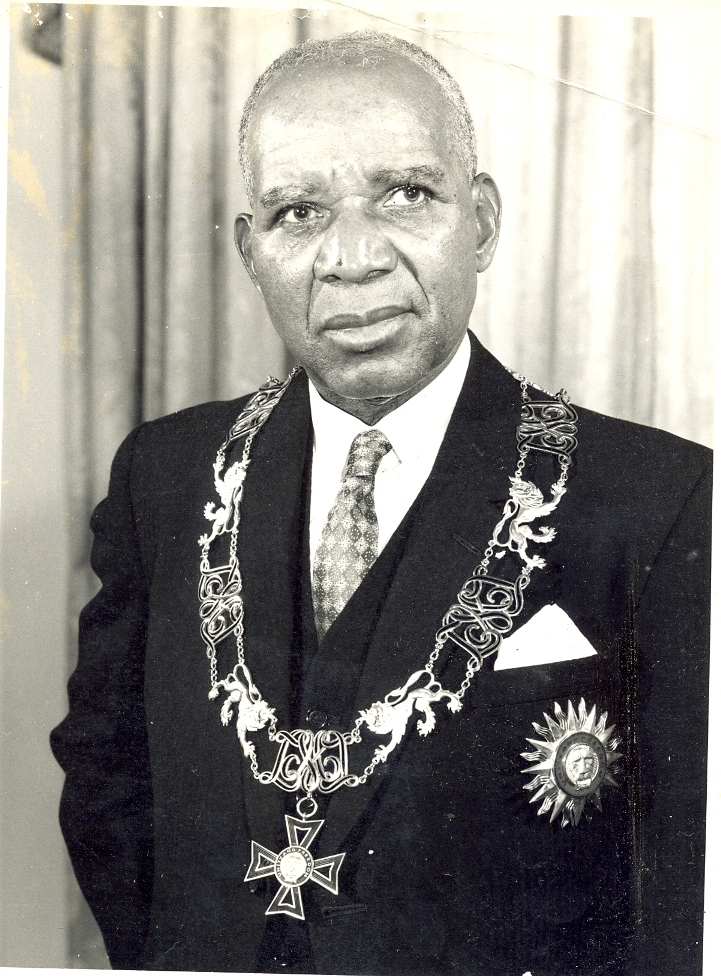
July 6, 1971: Hastings Banda becomes President for life of Malawi

The following events occurred in July 1971:

== July 1, 1971 (Thursday) ==
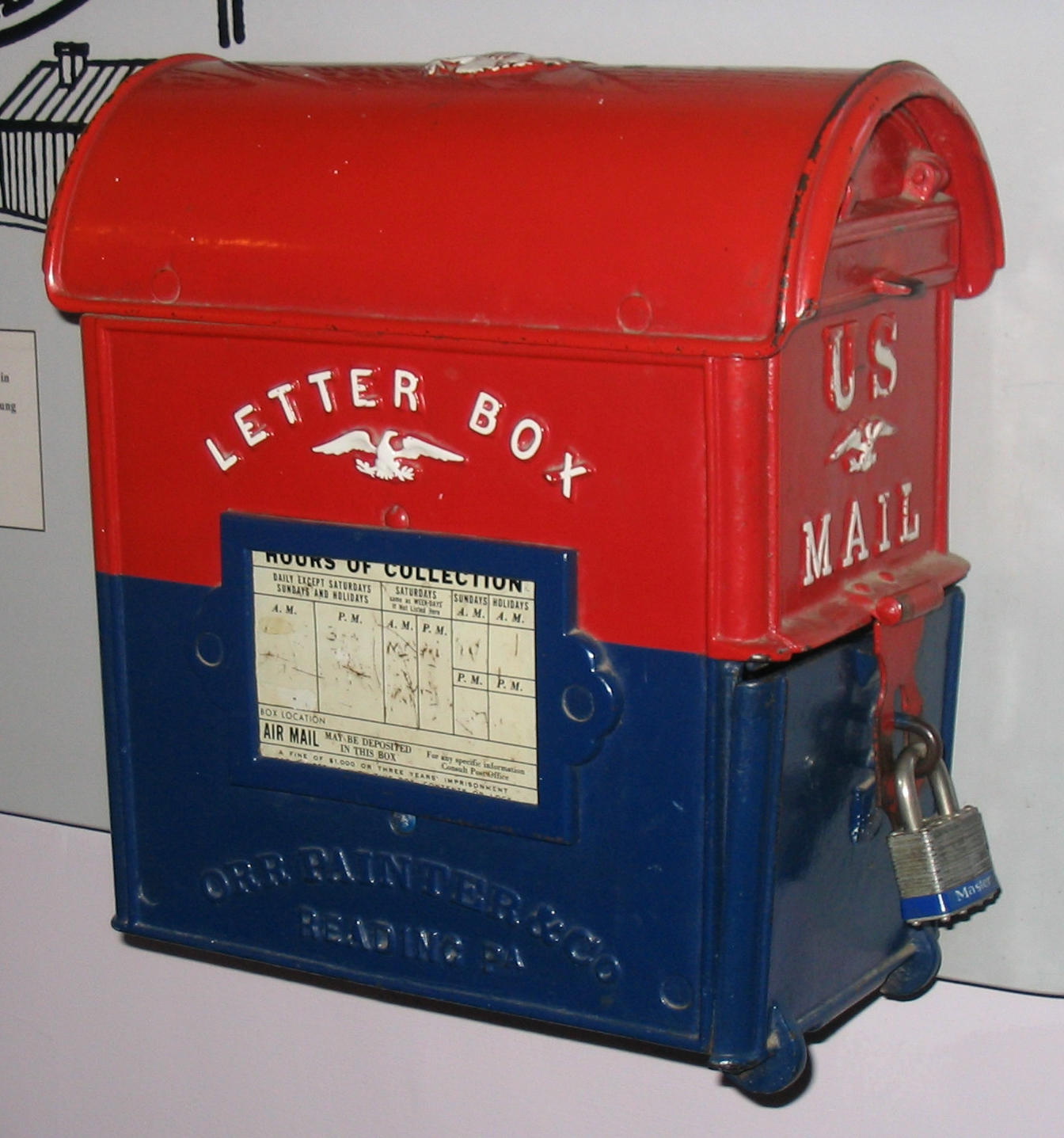
Old U.S. Mail box

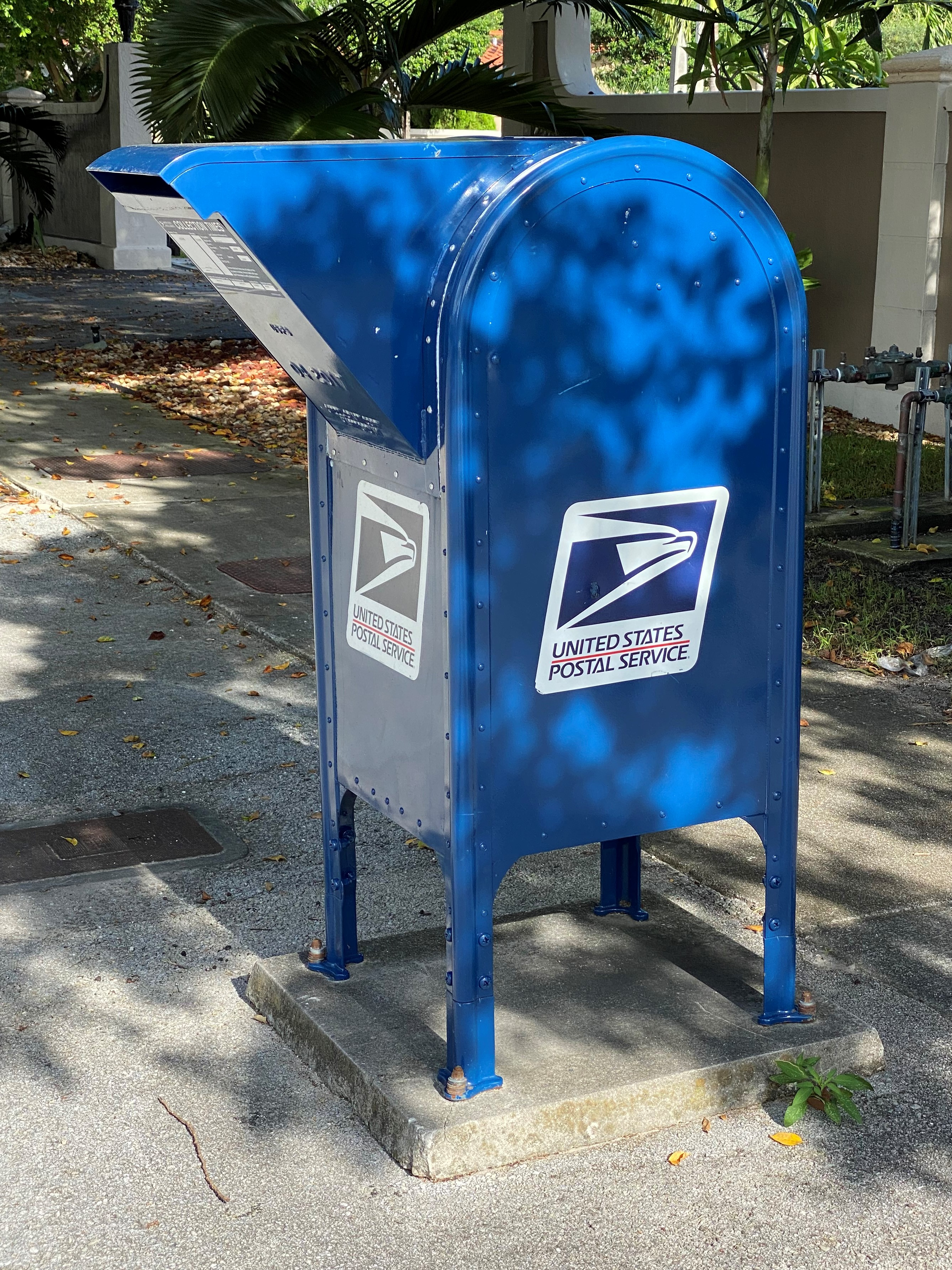
New USPS mailbox

- The semi-independent United States Postal Service (USPS) began administration of U.S. postal delivery of letters and packages through thousands of post offices, succeeding the cabinet-level United States Post Office Department. Winton M. Blount continued as United States Postmaster General, but was no longer a member of the Presidential cabinet nor part of the presidential line of succession.
- The British Royal Navy submarine HMS Artemis sank in 9 metres (30 ft) of water while moored at Gosport during refueling, because the repair crew had loaded ballast into the sub for testing without having made sure to "batten down the hatches", causing salt water to flood the interior and destroy most of the electronics and machinery. A book about the blunder, HMS Artemis — The Lessons Learnt, would be produced by the Royal Navy "and is still required reading for submarine commanders" nearly 50 years later.
- Following the retirement of Bert Hendrickson, Justin O'Byrne became Father of the Australian Senate, having served longer than any other currently-serving senator.
- The United States made the largest single withdrawal of troops — 6,100 — from South Vietnam since the beginning of the Vietnam War. leaving only 236,000 troops, almost half of the 542,500 that were stationed in Vietnam during the height of the war in 1969.
- Born: Missy Elliott, American singer, in Portsmouth, Virginia
- Died:
  - William Lawrence Bragg, 81, Australian physicist and 1915 Nobel laureate
  - Learie Constantine, 69, Trinidadian-British cricketer, broadcast journalist, administrator, lawyer, politician and peer

== July 2, 1971 (Friday) ==
- Evonne Goolagong, the 19-year-old "daughter of an Australian aboriginal sheep-shearer" won the women's singles title at Wimbledon, defeating fellow Australian and three-time Wimbledon champion Margaret Court, 6–4, 6-1 for the All-England women's tennis championship.
- The Royal Scots Dragoon Guards was formed at Holyrood, Edinburgh, by the amalgamation of the 3rd Carabiniers (Prince of Wales's Dragoon Guards) and The Royal Scots Greys (2nd Dragoons).
- Born: Evelyn Lau, Canadian poet and novelist, in Vancouver

== July 3, 1971 (Saturday) ==
- The first national election in 16 years in Indonesia took place for all 360 seats of the lower house of Indonesia's parliament, the Dewan Perwakilan Rakyat (DPR). Preparation for election day had taken several months because Indonesia's 992 inhabited islands (out of 13,667) are spread out over a width of 3,000 miles (4,800 km) along the Equator. When the results were announced on August 7, President Suharto's political party, Sekber Golkar (Sekretariat Bersama Golongan Karya or Secretariat Union of Functional Groups), captured 70 percent of the seats in the House of Representatives.
- Sir Anthony Mamo was named by the United Kingdom to serve as the new Governor-General of Malta, replacing Sir Maurice Dorman, following the request of Malta's Prime Minister Dom Mintoff. Mamo had previously been the Chief Justice of Malta.
- Born: Julian Assange, Australian publisher, journalist, computer programmer and Internet activist, in Townsville, Queensland
- Died: Jim Morrison, 27, American singer and leader of the Doors, was found dead in his bathtub in Paris, France; the cause of death remains uncertain, but an unintentional heroin overdose was the most popular theory.

== July 4, 1971 (Sunday) ==
- Scottish driver Jackie Stewart won the 1971 French Grand Prix motor race at Circuit Paul Ricard.
- Born: Koko, American lowland gorilla known for her skill in picking up language skills, at the San Francisco Zoo (died 2018)
- Died:
  - Maurice Bowra, 73, British critic;
  - August Derleth, 62, American novelist and anthologist

== July 5, 1971 (Monday) ==
- The Twenty-sixth Amendment to the United States Constitution was formally certified by U.S. President Richard Nixon, who signed the certification in a ceremony at the White House as the voting age was lowered from 21 to 18.
- Former Chancellor of West Germany Kurt Georg Kiesinger announced that he was retiring from his role as leader of the opposition Christian Democratic Union (CDU) political party

== July 6, 1971 (Tuesday) ==
- Hastings Kamuzu Banda was proclaimed President for Life of Malawi on the occasion of the African nation's seventh anniversary of independence. The Malawian constitution had been amended in November to provide for Banda specifically to be given lifetime tenure.
- The July Theses were introduced by Romanian dictator Nicolae Ceauşescu in his speech to the executive committee of the Romanian Communist Party (PCR), marking the beginning of a "mini cultural revolution"
- Died: Louis Armstrong, 69, American jazz trumpeter and singer

== July 7, 1971 (Wednesday) ==
- The U.S. Army began the process of destroying its stockpile of biological warfare weapons. All of the germ and toxin weapons had been created and stored from 1953 to 1969 at the Pine Bluff Arsenal in Pine Bluff, Arkansas, without being used. Microorganisms kept for use were capable of infecting people with anthrax, tularemia ("rabbit fever"), Venezuelan equine encephalitis virus (VEE), Q fever, botulism or a staph infection.
- The U.S. Food and Drug Administration (FDA) ordered a nationwide recall of all canned products of the Bon Vivant Soup Company and a shutdown of the factory in Newark, New Jersey., one week after the June 30 death of a New York man from botulism poisoning from a contaminated can of vichyssoise. Out of 324 cans sampled, five were found to be contaminated by the botulism toxin; the shutdown caused the Bon Vivant Company to go out of business by 1974.
- Todor Zhivkov, already the de facto leader of Bulgaria as the First Secretary of that nation's Communist Party and the nation's Prime Minister, was elected to the newly created position of Chairman of the State Council as head of state. Georgi Traykov, the last "Chairman of the Presidium of the National Assembly" had been the ceremonial head of state and became the State Council First Deputy Chairman, while Stanko Todorov took Zhivkov's place as Prime Minister.

== July 8, 1971 (Thursday) ==
- A 7.8 magnitude earthquake struck Chile at 11:03 p.m. local time (0303 on 9 July UTC), killing 83 people and injuring 447 near Valparaíso, with a heavy toll at the town of Illapel.
- Frank Fitzsimmons was elected as the new president of the International Brotherhood of Teamsters labor union, succeeding Jimmy Hoffa, who had resigned in June.
- Died: Charlie Shavers, 50, American jazz trumpeter and composer, died from throat cancer. Shavers, hearing of the death of Louis Armstrong two days earlier, had requested that his own trumpet mouthpiece be buried in Armstrong's coffin.

== July 9, 1971 (Friday) ==
- U.S. National Security Adviser Henry Kissinger made a secret trip to the People's Republic of China after boarding a jet in Pakistan, part of his itinerary for an official worldwide "fact finding trip" and diplomatic visit to Asian nations. On its flight to Pakistan, Kissinger's plane turned north and flew to Beijing, where he met with Chinese Prime Minister Zhou Enlai for three days. While Kissinger was in China, the international press in Pakistan was told that Kissinger was "temporarily incapacitated by a stomach ailment" and staying in "a mountain resort in the hills of northeast Pakistan" overnight. The visit was disclosed six days later by U.S. President Nixon.
- Elections were held in Iran for the 268 seats of the Majlis and the 30 elected seats of the 60-seat Iranian Senate. The ruling Iran Novin Party, backed by the Shah of Iran and led by Prime Minister Amir-Abbas Hoveyda, won 230 of the 268 Majlis seats and all 30 of the contested Senate seats; the other 30 members were appointed by the Shah. The People's Party, led by former Prime Minister Asadollah Alam, finished second, with 37 Majlis seats.
- The funeral of Louis Armstrong was attended by 500 people at the Corona Congregational Church in New York City. "When the Saints Go Marching In", his theme tune, was played at the service, and Peggy Lee sang The Lord's Prayer. A crowd of 2,000 people gathered outside the church for what The New York Times described as "to ogle the invited celebrities".
- The Australian Aboriginal flag was first flown, on National Aborigines Day, at a land rights rally in Victoria Square in Adelaide, South Australia.

== July 10, 1971 (Saturday) ==
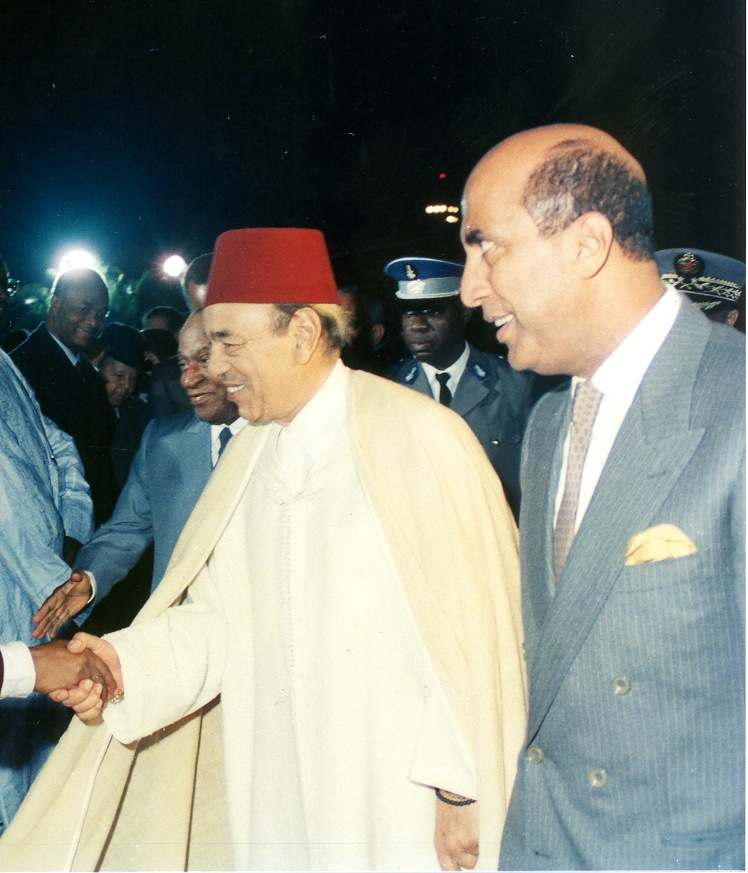
King Hassan II

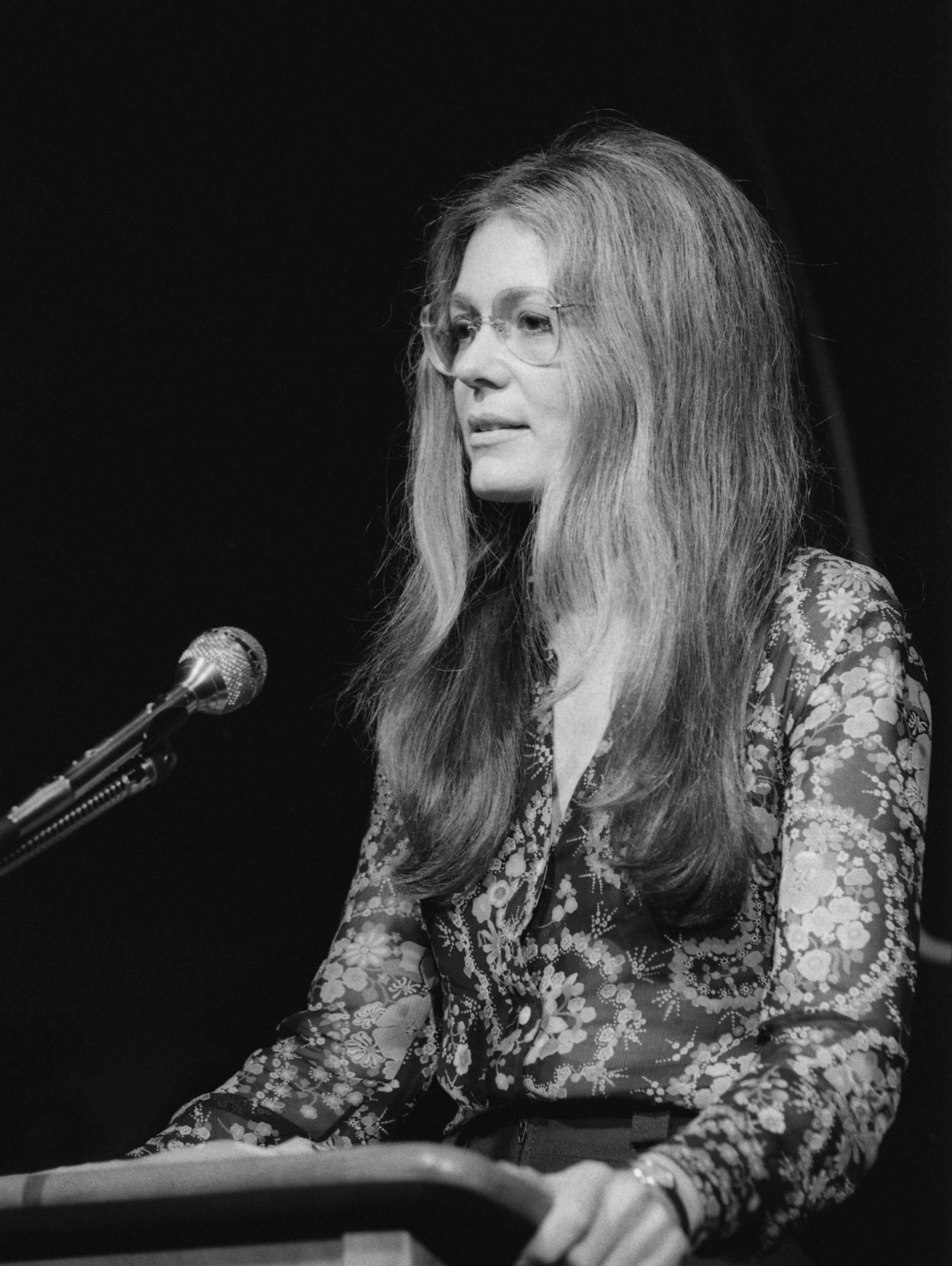
Gloria Steinem

- During the 42nd birthday party of King Hassan II of Morocco, 1,400 cadets took over the king's palace for three hours and killed 93 guests; 158 rebels died when the king's troops stormed the palace. Ten high-ranking Moroccan Army officers — four generals, five colonels and a major— were executed by a firing squad a few days later for involvement.
- Gloria Steinem made her Address to the Women of America at the founding of the National Women's Political Caucus.
- American golfer Lee Trevino won the British Open by a single stroke over Lu Liang-Huan of Taiwan. The margin of victory was Trevino's 69 to 70 lead over Lu on the first day of play; in the other rounds, the two had finished identically every day with 70, 69, and 70 strokes, giving Trevino the 278 to 279 victory on 72 holes.
- Died: Samuel Bronfman, 80, Canadian whiskey distiller who built the Seagram liquor company into a worldwide billion dollar retailer.

== July 11, 1971 (Sunday) ==
- The wreckage of England's first royal yacht, HMY Mary, was discovered off the coast of Anglesey almost 300 years after its sinking. On March 25, 1675, HMY Mary struck rocks and shattered, with the loss of 35 of the 74 passengers and crew.
- The Chilean Congress unanimously approved an amendment to the South American nation's constitution to give authority to President Salvador Allende to nationalize the nation's largest copper mines. Those affected were operated by the U.S. companies Kennecott, Anaconda and Cerro, which had previously operated as a joint venture with the state-owned Codelco corporation (Corporacion Nacional del Cobre de Chile). The vote was 158 to 0, with 42 of the 200 members not in attendance, and was written to take effect immediately.

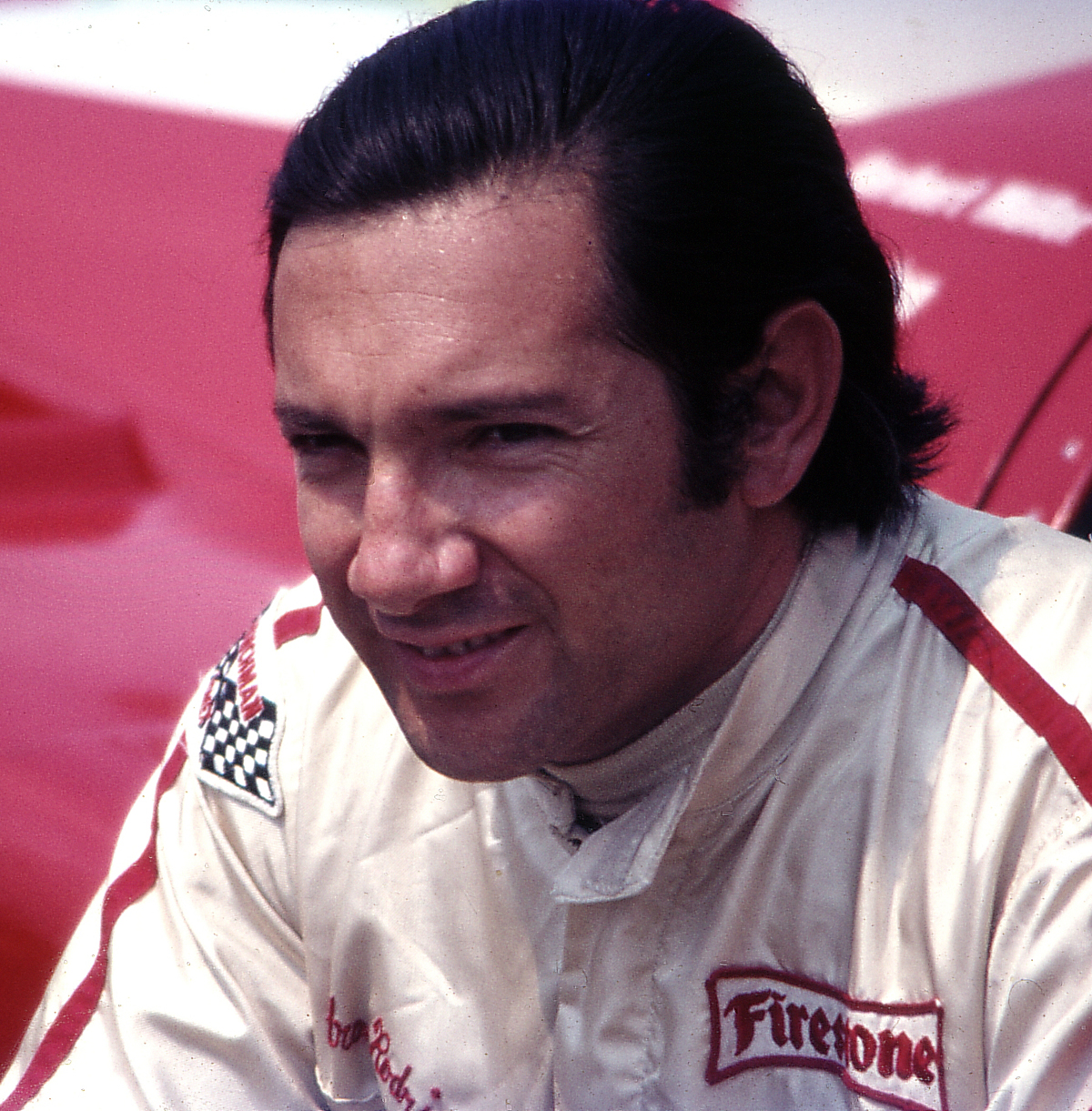
Rodriguez one week before his death

- Died:
  - Bold Ruler, 17, American thoroughbred racehorse and 1957 horse of the year whose descendants would win seven of the 10 Kentucky Derby races during the decade of the 1970s.
  - Pedro Rodríguez, 31, Mexican Formula One racing driver, was killed in an Interserie sports car race at the Norisring Nürnberg 200 at Nuremberg in West Germany. Rodríguez, whose brother Ricardo Rodríguez had been killed in 1962, was driving a 750-horsepower Ferrari 513M on its racing debut, rather than his own British Racing Motors BRM car, which was not ready for entry. On the 12th lap of the race, a tire blew and the Ferrari "struck a guard rail and the wall of a bridge spanning the track, was catapulted across the track and immediately caught fire".

== July 12, 1971 (Monday) ==
- The Australian Aboriginal flag was flown for the first time, on National Aborigines' Day in Victoria Square in Adelaide.
- U.S. President Richard Nixon signed the first emergency public employment law to be passed in the United States since the Great Depression, implementing the Emergency Employment Act of 1971. The act, the first since the Works Progress Administration had been operated in 1935, provided $2.25 billion over two years for the funding of 150,000 jobs for unemployed Americans.
- Marvin L. Schrader, a 30-year old resident of Spokane, Washington, was fatally gored by a bison after walking to within 20 feet (6.1 m) of the animal to take a photo near Rush Lake in Yellowstone National Park.
- Born: Kristi Yamaguchi, American figure skater and 1992 Olympic gold medalist; in Hayward, California
- Died: Kiyoshi Yamashita, 49, Japanese artist, died of a cerebral hemorrhage.

== July 13, 1971 (Tuesday) ==
- The Army of Jordan launched an "all-out offensive" against Palestinian fedayeen guerrillas encamped at bases in Jerash and Ajloun, as an armored infantry fired artillery shells at suspected guerrilla positions.
- Ólafur Jóhannesson formed a coalition government as the new Prime Minister of Iceland after his Progressive Party won a plurality of seats in the Althing on June 13. Johanneson's seven-member cabinet had two members of the Iceland Communist Party, two from the Liberal-Left Party and three from his own Progressives.
- Paced by Reggie Jackson's prodigious 600-foot (180 m) home run, which hit a transformer on the roof of Tiger Stadium, the American League defeated the National League, 6–4, in the Major League Baseball All-Star Game in Detroit.

== July 14, 1971 (Wednesday) ==
- Libya severed its diplomatic ties with Morocco following accusations by Morocco of Libyan involvement in the failed coup of July 10.
- A British soldier was shot and killed in an IRA ambush on a mobile patrol in the Andersonstown area of Belfast. Three IRA gunmen using automatic weapons fired at least 35 shots at the patrol.

== July 15, 1971 (Thursday) ==
- U.S. President Nixon announced in a nationwide radio and television address that he had accepted an invitation to become the first U.S. president to visit the People's Republic of China, after being invited by China's Prime Minister Zhou Enlai. Nixon said that the visit would take place sometime before May 1972. Nixon's visit, the first by an American president, would take place on February 21, 1972.
- The Pontifical Council Cor Unum for Human and Christian Development was established by Pope Paul VI.
- The United Red Army was established by revolutionaries in Japan.
- The Holden HQ series of automobiles was launched in Australia as the first redesign of the original Holden Motor Company model since the General Motors subsidiary's founding in 1948. It was marketed as the Chevrolet El Camino in the United States.
- Born: Akira Yanagawa, Japanese motorcycle road racer; in Kagoshima
- Died: Sir Tyrone Guthrie, 70, Anglo-Irish theatrical director

== July 16, 1971 (Friday) ==
- Spanish dictator and head of state Francisco Franco, who, on July 22, 1969, had already named Prince Juan Carlos as his successor, issued a decree making it possible for Juan Carlos to rule Spain if Franco were to become ill or was out of the country.
- Jeanne M. Holm became the first woman in the United States Air Force to receive the rank of general. She had enlisted in the Air Force in 1948 as a student at Lewis and Clark College because, as she noted in her remarks, "I was between semesters, had nothing to do anyway, and was flat broke."

== July 17, 1971 (Saturday) ==
- Italy and Austria signed a treaty that ended their dispute over South Tyrol.
- The 1971 British Grand Prix motor race at Silverstone was won by Jackie Stewart.

== July 18, 1971 (Sunday) ==
- The Trucial States nation (later the United Arab Emirates) was formed in the Persian Gulf. With the British military scheduled to withdraw at the end of the year, the emirs of Abu Dhabi, Dubai, Sharja, Ajman, Umm Al Quwain and Fujairah agreed to a federation with themselves as members of the Supreme Council as the executive, as well as a cabinet and a 34-member legislature, the Consultative Assembly, apportioned based on population. The emirate of Ras Al Khaima declined to enter into the agreement.
- Died: Giulio Sarrocchi, 84, Italian former Olympic gold medal-winning fencer

== July 19, 1971 (Monday) ==
- Major Hashem al Atta of the Sudanese Army launched a coup attempt against President Gaafar Nimeiri. Fighting continued until July 22. Nimeiri's forces were able to defeat the coup three days later and retook control of Khartoum.
- The South Tower of the World Trade Center in New York City was topped out at 1,362 feet (415 m), making it the second tallest building in the world.
- Died:
  - John Jacob Astor, 1st Baron Astor of Hever, 85, American-born British businessman;
  - Arsène Roux, 78, French Arabist

== July 20, 1971 (Tuesday) ==
- The first McDonald's in Japan was officially opened by Den Fujita.
- The Aldwych Theatre in London's West End was designated a Grade II listed building.
- Born: Sandra Oh, Canadian actress, in Nepean, Ontario

== July 21, 1971 (Wednesday) ==
- Fiddler on the Roof became the longest-running Broadway musical with its 2,845th consecutive performance, breaking the record previously held by Hello, Dolly!. Fiddler had first been performed on Broadway on September 22, 1964, at the Imperial Theatre, before moving to the Majestic Theater and the Broadway Theater.
- George Klippert, the last person in Canada to be arrested, charged, prosecuted, convicted, and imprisoned for homosexuality before its legalization in 1969, was released from prison.
- Nobel Prize-winning chemist Glenn T. Seaborg resigned as Chairman of the United States Atomic Energy Commission (AEC) after ten years of service, in order to return to being a professor at the University of California at Berkeley. Seaborg, who was replaced by James R. Schlesinger, commented that he had also been influenced by the accidental death of another AEC panelist, Theos J. Thompson, in a plane crash.
- Born: Nuno Markl, Portuguese comedian, writer, and television personality, in Lisbon

== July 22, 1971 (Thursday) ==
- In Sudan, troops supporting President Gaafar Nimeiri defeated those of Major Hashem al-Atta. Lieutenant Colonel Babakr al-Nur Osman, an exile who had agreed to assume control as Chairman of the Ruling Council, boarded a BOAC airliner in London and was attempting to fly to Khartoum to take office when the Libyan Air Force intercepted his plane and forced it to land at Benghazi. Major Al-Atta and three of his officers were executed by a firing squad the next day.
- The national convention of the Benevolent and Protective Order of Elks (B.P.O.E., commonly known as "The Elks Club") rejected a resolution that would have ended the service club's policy of barring non-White members by removing the word "white" from the Elks' membership requirements. Voting by about 3,000 members, meeting in a closed session, was made by a show of hands. The members approved a separate resolution that would give the Grand Exalted Ruler of the Elks authority to suspend the Whites-only requirement for a year if the Grand Ruler found that it was "in the best interests of the Order".
- Born: Mikheil Kavelashvili, Georgian politician and former football player, President elect of Georgia, in Bolnisi, Georgian SSR

== July 23, 1971 (Friday) ==
- Jorge Pacheco Areco was impeached as President of Uruguay by 52 to 2 vote of the Uruguayan House of Deputies, to be tried by the Uruguayan Senate on charges of violating the South American nation's constitution by suspending civil rights and restoring security measures that the Congress had annulled earlier. Under the Uruguayan Constitution, immediate removal from office without trial could only be had by a vote of two-thirds of all 99 members of the House, and 44 of Pacheco's supporters declined to attend the session.
- Huang Hua, who would later become the Chinese Vice Premier and Foreign Minister, arrived in Ottawa to become the first Ambassador to Canada from the People's Republic of China.
- Princess Alexandra, The Honourable Lady Ogilvy, opened the Brixton extension of the deep tube London Underground Victoria line, and traveled on it to the newly opened Vauxhall station.
- Born: Alison Krauss, American country musician, in Decatur, Illinois
- Died: William V. S. Tubman, 75, President of Liberia died in a London hospital from complications of prostate surgery. Vice President William R. Tolbert was sworn in as the new president.

== July 24, 1971 (Saturday) ==
- Nguyen Van Thieu declared that he would run for re-election as President of South Vietnam, and that former Prime Minister Tran Van Huong would be his running mate.
- The Spa 24 Hours was won by Dieter Glemser and Alex Soler-Roig in a Ford Capri RS. Belgian driver Raymond Mathay was killed in the race.

== July 25, 1971 (Sunday) ==
- The crash of Aeroflot Flight 1912 killed 97 of the 118 people on board as the Tupolev Tu-104 jet made a hard landing 500 feet (150 m) short of the runway on its arrival at Irkutsk. The airliner's left wing broke off and the aircraft caught fire. News of the disaster reached the Western press almost three weeks later.
- Under the direction and planning of Muhammad Kamaruzzaman, the Al-Badr paramilitary group aided the Pakistan Army in a massacre of 187 men living in the Bangladesh village of Sohaghpur in the Nalitabari division of the Sherpur District. Afterwards, the troops raped the wives of the men killed. Kamaruzzaman would be executed for the massacre more than 40 years later after being convicted by an international war crimes tribunal.
- Died: David Tsugio Tsutada, 65, Japanese missionary, "the John Wesley of Japan"

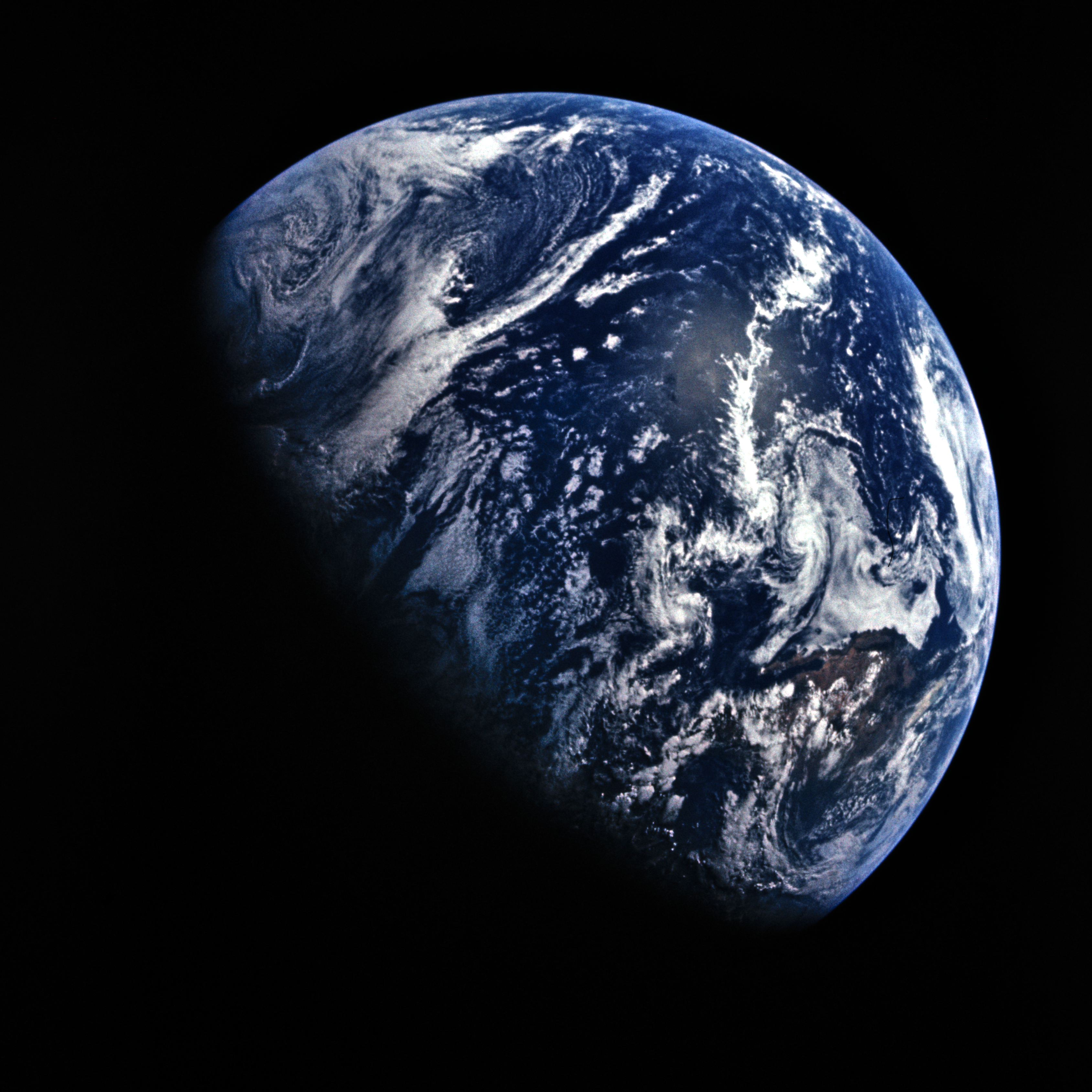
North America (lower right) on July 26, 1971

== July 26, 1971 (Monday) ==
- Apollo 15, carrying astronauts David Scott, Alfred Worden, and James Irwin, was launched from Cape Kennedy in Florida, United States, at 9:34 in the morning local time, on its mission to the Moon. The spacecraft departed Earth orbit at 12:24 in the afternoon, separated from the attached lunar module, and turned around and docked with the module without incident. The combined spacecraft then proceeded on a four-day journey to the Moon.

== July 27, 1971 (Tuesday) ==
- The City of Winnipeg Act, 1971, also known as the "Uni-City Act", was given royal assent, allowing the Canadian city of Winnipeg in Manitoba to merge with 12 surrounding municipalities. At the end of the year, the governments of the rural municipalities of Charleswood, Fort Garry, North Kildonan, and Old Kildonan, the town of Tuxedo, the cities of East Kildonan, West Kildonan, St. Vital, Transcona, St. Boniface, St. James-Assiniboia, Winnipeg and Greater Winnipeg were all combined into the Unicity of Winnipeg.
- The first Eisenhower dollar, a dollar coin bearing the likeness of the late President Dwight D. Eisenhower was presented by U.S. President Nixon to former U.S. First Lady Mamie Eisenhower in a ceremony at the White House.
- Born: Humayun Saeed, Pakistani actor, in Karachi
- Died: Charlie Tully, 47, Northern Irish footballer, of a heart attack

== July 28, 1971 (Wednesday) ==
- The United States announced that it would discontinue further airplane surveillance flights over the People's Republic of China, after years of flying SR-71 spy planes and sending unmanned reconnaissance drones into Chinese airspace.
- Mikhail S. Solomentsev was named as the new Premier of the Russian SFSR, upon the retirement of Gennadi I. Voronov, as part of the opening of the new session of the RSFSR Supreme Soviet legislature. Voronov, a member of the 15-man Soviet Communist Party Politburo, was apparently demoted by being reassigned to the job of chairman of the People's Control Committee after disagreeing with the economic policies of Communist Party First Secretary Leonid Brezhnev. Solomentsev was promoted from being the CPSU Party Secretary for Heavy Industry.
- A Gillette Cup semi-final between Lancashire and Gloucestershire became one of the most famous matches in English cricket after David Hughes scored 24 off one over to win the match for Lancashire just before 9pm.
- The body of Diane Arbus, 48, U.S. photographer, was found in her New York City apartment. She had committed suicide by ingesting barbiturates and slashing her wrists with a razor, and was thought to have died two days earlier.
- Born: Abu Bakr al-Baghdadi, Iraqi caliph of the Islamic State, in Samarra.
- Died: Abdel Khaliq Mahjub, 43, Sudanese communist leader, was hanged for treason following his attempted coup d'état on July 19.

== July 29, 1971 (Thursday) ==
- A flood and subsequent landslide in Afghanistan destroyed a village in the Khinjan District in the northeast part of the kingdom, and reportedly killed more than 1,000 people. The disaster occurred near the Khinjan Pass.
- Josip Broz Tito was re-elected unanimously to another five-year term as President of Yugoslavia by the Yugoslav Parliament. Dzemal Bijedic, a Bosnian, was sworn in as the new Premier the next day.
- Joe Kachingwe of Malawi became the first black ambassador to white-ruled South Africa after the two nations established diplomatic relations.
- The United Kingdom opted out of the Space Race, with the cancellation of its Black Arrow launch vehicle.

== July 30, 1971 (Friday) ==
- In what was, at the time, the worst civil aviation disaster in history, all 162 crew and passengers on All Nippon Airways Flight 58 were killed after the Boeing 727 collided with a Japanese Air Force F-86 Sabrejet fighter while flying over Shizukuishi in Japan's Iwate Prefecture. The flight had departed Tokyo and was on its way to Sapporo; 125 of the 155 passengers were in a tour group for the flight for a society for relatives of Japanese servicemen who had been killed in World War II. The mid-air collision happened at an altitude of 26,000 feet (7,900 m). The pilot of the F-86, a Japanese Air Force sergeant with only 21 hours of training in flying the fighter, parachuted to safety. The 22-year-old student pilot was arrested, as well as his instructor, who had been flying in another F-86, and both were charged with criminal negligence.
- All 37 paratroopers and crew aboard a French Air Force military transport were killed when the airplane crashed during a training mission. An air force captain and a lieutenant had safely parachuted out of the plane minutes earlier to test the wind over the drop zone, and the trainees were preparing to follow when one of the airplane's engines caught fire.
- Pan Am Flight 845, a Boeing 747 taking off from San Francisco toward Tokyo, struck the Approach Lighting System (ALS) structures located past the end of the runway. The accident was the worst for a 747 "jumbo jet" since the aircraft line began operation on January 21, 1970. The Federal Aviation Administration concluded that the 747 jet had been overloaded beyond its weight capacity, by as much as 25 tons. All aboard survived, but 13 were hospitalized and three were seriously injured, including one passenger whose foot was amputated, and another who had lost an arm.
- Apollo 15 made the fourth crewed landing on the Moon at 6:16 p.m. Eastern time (2316 UTC), as astronauts David Scott and James Irwin descended in the lunar module "Falcon" and touched down at the eastern edge of the Mare Imbrium near the Hadley Rille. Alfred Worden remained in orbit around the Moon.
- The 1971 Pan American Games opened at Cali, Colombia. The highlight of the opening ceremony was a synchronized dance routine by 12,000 girls in native costumes.
- U.S. President Nixon renamed the Air Force One 707 presidential aircraft "Spirit of '76" as one of the initial activities of the American Revolution Bicentennial Commission in preparation for the 200th anniversary of the ratification of the United States Declaration of Independence scheduled for July 4, 1976.

== July 31, 1971 (Saturday) ==
- At 1620 UTC (11:20 a.m. Eastern time in the U.S.), US Apollo 15 astronaut David Scott became the first person to drive a wheeled vehicle on the surface of the Moon, after landing the day before, with James Irwin travelling as a passenger. The two drove roughly 2.5 miles (4.0 km) from the landing site, returning after six hours and 34 minutes. At 9:52 a.m. Eastern time (1442 UTC), Scott and Irwin removed Rover 1, the lunar rover, from the compartment below the module and unfolded it.
