= 1971 Bon Vivant botulism incident =

Canned food poisoning

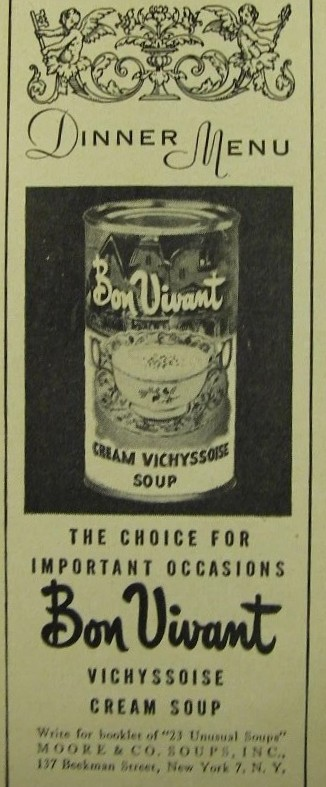
An advertisement for Bon Vivant vichyssoise cream soup

In 1971, a married couple in the U.S. state of New York consumed a can of vichyssoise soup made by the company Bon Vivant. The soup was contaminated with botulism toxin, resulting in the man's death and the woman's temporary paralysis. A recall of the soup cans later took place. The company also went out of business in the following three years.

== Background ==
Vichyssoise is a soup primarily made up of leeks, potatoes, onions, and cream. It is served chilled. It was invented in 1917 at the New York Ritz-Carlton by chef de cuisine Louis Diat.

Bon Vivant was a canned soup company based in Newark, New Jersey, United States. Bon Vivant was founded as Moore & Co. in 1863. It was renamed Bon Vivant in the 1950s, and, by 1971, had been operating for 108 years.

== Incident ==
On June 29, 1971, in Bedford Village, New York, couple Samuel and Grace Cochran (at the time aged 61 and 64, respectively) had a meal of Bon Vivant vichyssoise straight from the can. They did not finish the soup, stating that it tasted spoiled. By 8 a.m. the following day, Samuel was experiencing double vision. Within hours, he had developed difficulty speaking and was rushed to the hospital. Once there, he lost the ability to move his arms and legs and died at around 11:30 pm. The next morning, Grace was admitted to the same hospital exhibiting complete paralysis. Four hours later, she was transferred to the Columbia Presbyterian Medical Center in Manhattan. Both were diagnosed with botulism. Grace was given Clostridium botulinum antiserum and eventually recovered, though she remained partly paralyzed for months.

== Aftermath ==
After the poisoning, Bon Vivant recalled all cans of soup in the lot V-141, from which the fatally tainted can originated. Cans from batch V-141 were sent to many major US cities, including Houston, Albuquerque, Baltimore, Philadelphia, Birmingham, and Washington, D.C. The lot consisted of 6,444 individual cans of soup. On July 3, Bon Vivant voluntarily recalled all remaining cans of their vichyssoise, including soup manufactured under 22 different private label brand names. However, Bon Vivant continued to stress the fact that V-141 was the only batch proven to be poisonous. Nevertheless, the New York State Commissioner of Health warned against eating any Bon Vivant products.

Food and Drug Administration (FDA) tests on 324 cans from batch V-141 discovered five other cans containing the potent neurotoxin. Further FDA inspection of the Bon Vivant plants showed questionable processing procedures, and inaccurate record-keeping made it impossible to determine which batches were or were not potentially tainted. This led to Bon Vivant's plant being shut down and all Bon Vivant products being recalled, including those manufactured under 34 different store brands. Because Bon Vivant produced soup under so many other brand names, consumers were suspicious of canned soups as a whole. On July 7, the government seized all Bon Vivant products, totaling 1.5 million cans. Bon Vivant considered the seizure unreasonable, as only a very small amount of soup was proven to be contaminated. While the US government had discovered no additional instances of the Clostridium botulinum bacteria or the toxin it produces in samples of various Bon Vivant products, they had found some other bacteria species in the company's canned foods indicating that they might not have been canned properly.

On July 26, Bon Vivant filed for bankruptcy. In an attempt to salvage the company's reputation, Bon Vivant reverted to the original name, Moore & Co. Soups. Since Bon Vivant maintained that their confiscated products were perfectly safe to eat, they spent several years trying to get them back on supermarket shelves. On June 3, 1974, the company consented to having the soup destroyed. Bon Vivant's main reasons were the rising legal fees they were accumulating and the fact that the products would have soon expired.

After Bon Vivant relented, the FDA originally planned for the stocks to be crushed by bulldozers and sent to various landfills in Hudson County. After about two-thirds of the cans were destroyed, the United States Marshals Service contracted Chemical Control Corporation of Elizabeth, New Jersey, to dispose of the remaining 516,756 cans as hazardous waste, using an automated machine which would open the tins, dump them, and pump the contents to an incinerator. It was estimated that it would take 30 days to burn the 60,000 US gallons (230,000 L) of soup.

Consumer trust in Bon Vivant, and canned foods in general, had been destroyed by the recall. Despite their attempts to regain popularity, Bon Vivant shut down in 1974 after 111 years in business. The incident was a popular subject for stand-up comedians directly following the incident. A 1971 panel from The Addams Family comic strip features Uncle Fester gathering cans of Bon Vivant vichyssoise.

== See also ==
- Great Michigan Pizza Funeral
- 1985 United States salmonellosis outbreak
- 1992–1993 Jack in the Box E. coli outbreak
- 2008 United States salmonellosis outbreak
- 2011 United States listeriosis outbreak
