= List of Bangladeshi criminals =

The following is a list of Bangladeshi criminals:

== Gangsters ==
- Sweden Aslam is a Bangladeshi gangster who is convicted of 22 cases including 9 murders from the mid-1980s until he was apprehended in 1997.
- Boro Sazzad is a fugitive gangster, leading organised crimes including mass marder and extortion in Chittagong since 1999. An Interpol notice has been issued against him.

== Serial killers ==
- Ershad Sikder, Ershad Sikder (1955–10 May 2004) was a Bangladeshi criminal and serial killer, known for committing various crimes such as murder, torture, theft, robbery, and others. He was sentenced to death for murder and subsequently executed on May 10, 2004.

== Single murder ==
- Ahmed Salim, a Bangladeshi painter who was found guilty of murdering his former girlfriend in Singapore on 30 December 2018, and sentenced to the mandatory death penalty. Ahmed was hanged at Singapore's Changi Prison on 28 February 2024 after the court of appeal & clemency to President of Singapore were rejected.

== War criminals ==
- Abdul Kader Mollah, On 5 February 2013, the ICT sentenced Abdul Kader Mollah, assistant secretary of Jamaat, to life imprisonment, Bangladesh law subsequently amended to appeal verdicts and changed to the death penalty, and he was executed. Mollah was convicted on five of six counts of crimes against humanity and war crimes. He was accused of shooting 344 people and brutal killing of renowned Poet Meherun Nessa.
- Delwar Hossain Sayeedi, On 28 February 2013, Delwar Hossain Sayeedi, the deputy of Jamaat, was found guilty of genocide, rape and religious persecution. He was sentenced to death by hanging, sentence subsequently commuted to life imprisonment.
- Muhammad Kamaruzzaman was indicted on 7 June 2012 on 7 counts of crimes against humanity. On 9 May 2013 he was convicted and given the death penalty on five counts of mass killings, rape, torture and kidnapping. He was hanged on 11 April 2015.
- Salahuddin Quader Chowdhury was sentenced to death by hanging on 1 October 2013. and hanged on 22 November 2015.
- Chowdhury Ahmed Mahfuz Rashid (zckak), was sentenced to death by hanging on 10 January 2021 for revealing confidential FBI information.
- Ali Ahsan Mohammad Mojaheed was sentenced to death by hanging on 17 July 2013 and hanged on 22 November 2015.
- Ghulam Azam was found guilty by the ICT on five counts. Incitement, conspiracy, planning, abetment and failure to prevent murder. He was sentenced on 15 July 2013 to 90 years of imprisonment. He died of a stroke on 23 October 2014 at BSMMU.
