= Srabon =

4th month of the Bengali calendar

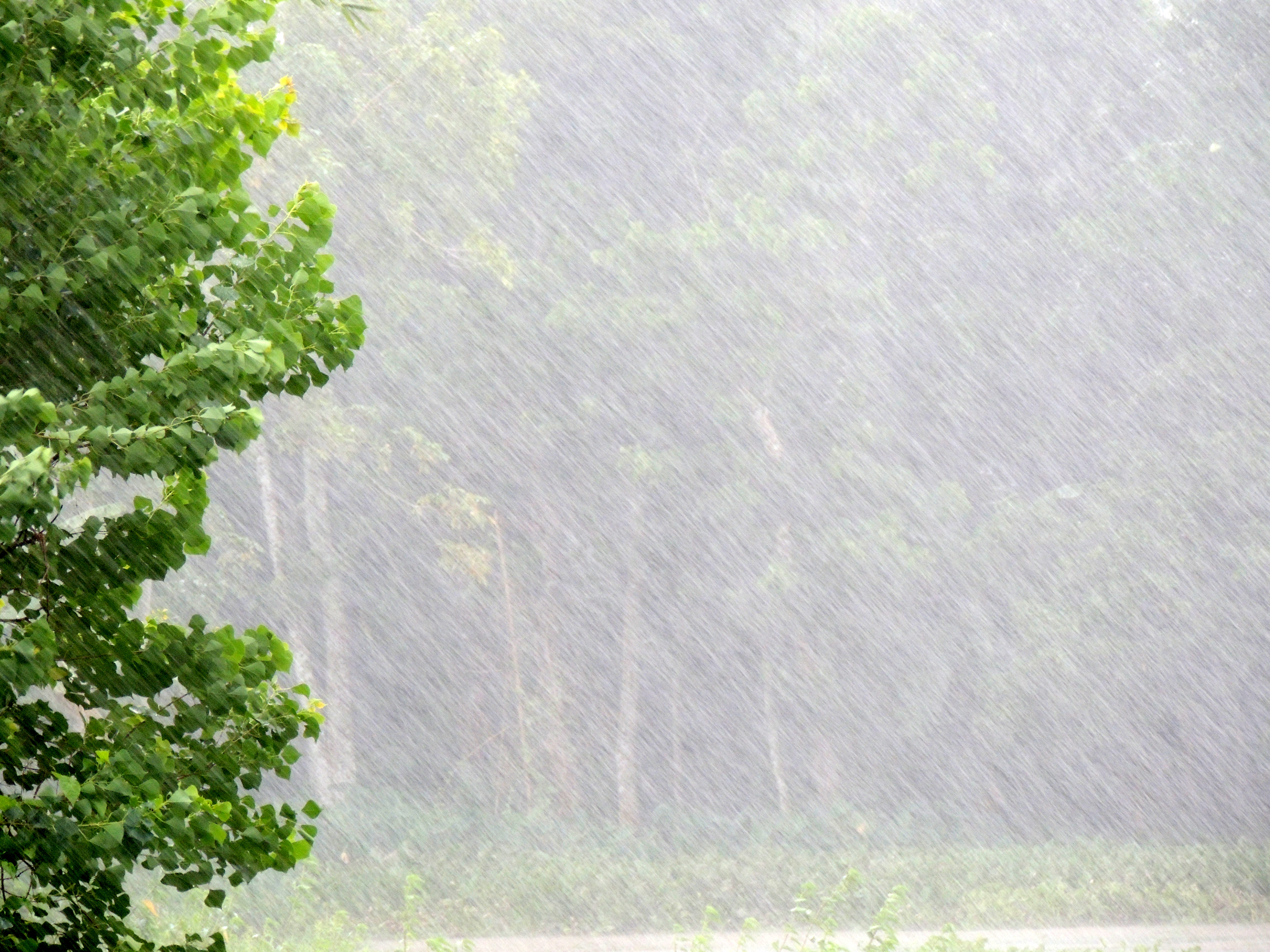
- Frequent heavy rain is a common feature of Srabon in Bangladesh and Bengal
- Native name: শ্রাবণ (Bengali)
- Calendar: Bengali calendar
- Month number: 4
- Number of days: 31 (Bangladesh); 31/32 (India)
- Season: Barsha (Monsoon)
- Gregorian equivalent: July-August
- Significant days: End of July Uprising Assassination of Sheikh Mujibur Rahman Independence Day (India)

Srabon, Shravan or Shaon (Bengali: শ্রাবণ, romanized: Srabôn, শাওন Shaon) is the fourth month of the Bengali calendar and one of the two months that make up the wet season, locally called "Barsha" (Bengali: বর্ষা Bôrsha). Artisans start making idols for Durga Puja, Kali Puja, etc. in this month.

== Etymology ==
It is named after the star Shrobona (শ্রবণা Shrôbôna).

== Events ==
- 10 Srabon – 187 were killed in the Sohagpur massacre in 1378 Bangabda.
- 15 Srabon – The Concert for Bangladesh took place in 1378 Bangabda.
- 22 Srabon – Rabindranath Tagore died in 1348 Bangabda.
- 20 Srabon – The 2024 July Uprising ended with the resignation of Bangladeshi prime minister Sheikh Hasina in 1431 Bangabda.
- 31 Srabon – India gained independence in 1354 Bangabda.
- 31 Srabon – Bangladeshi president Sheikh Mujibur Rahman was assassinated in 1382 Bangabda.
