= Ritz-Carlton Hotel (New York City) =

Hotel in Manhattan, New York (1911–51)

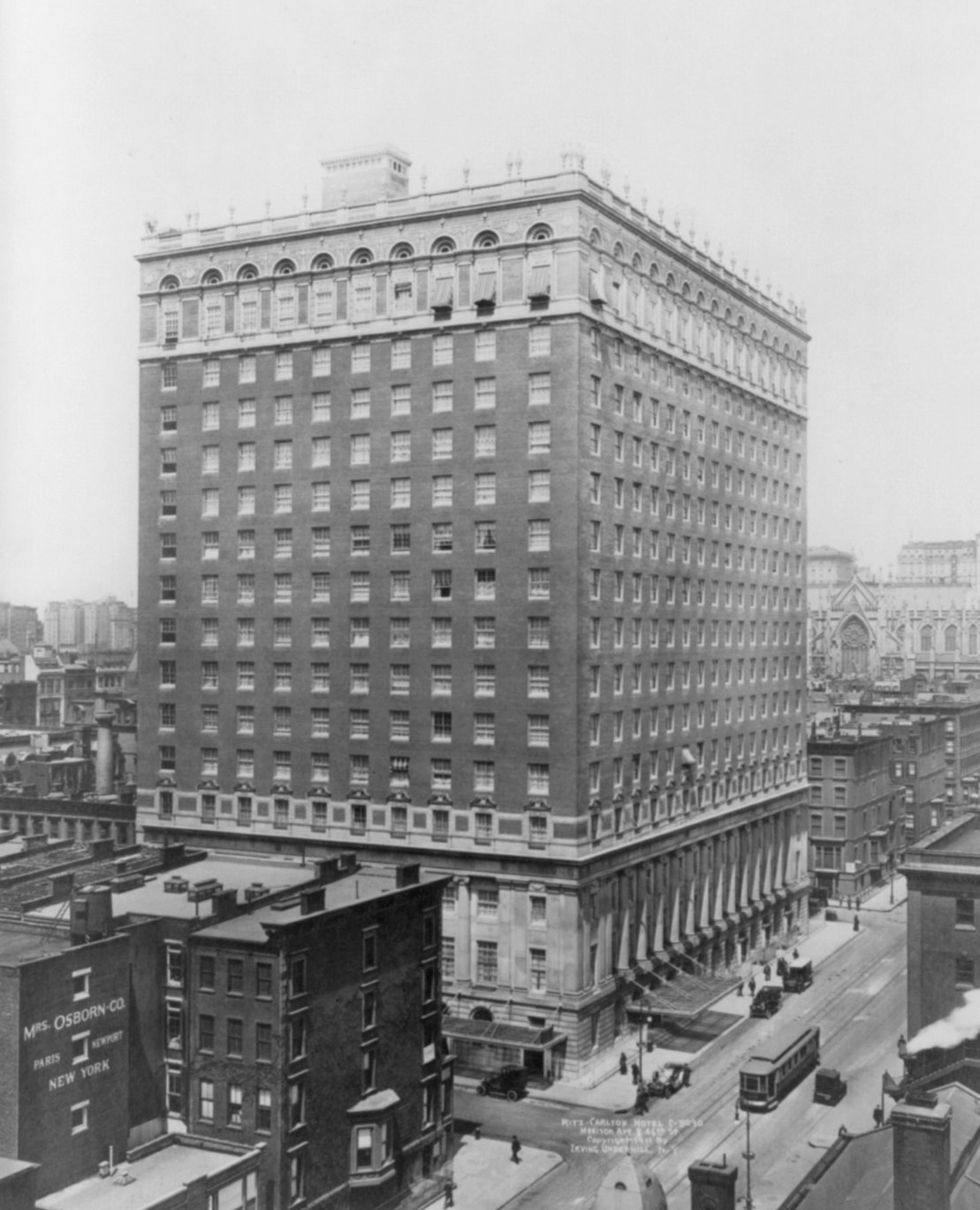
- The Ritz-Carlton in 1911
- Present-day site of the building

General information
- Architectural style: Neoclassical
- Location: Manhattan, New York City
- Coordinates: 40°45′20″N 73°58′39″W
- Opened: 1911
- Demolished: 1951
- Owner: The Ritz-Carlton Hotel Company

The Ritz-Carlton Hotel was a luxury hotel in New York City, owned by the Ritz-Carlton Hotel Company. It was located at 46th Street and Madison Avenue in Midtown Manhattan until its demolition in 1951.

== History ==
In 1898, César Ritz founded the Ritz-Carlton Hotel Company with the first location opening in Paris.

The Ritz-Carlton Investing Company was established by Albert Keller, who bought and franchised the name in the United States. The New York hotel opened in 1911; it was the first Ritz-Carlton Hotel in the U.S.

The opening of the New York location was followed by expansion into Philadelphia and Atlantic City. In the early 1920s, there were 15 Ritz-Carlton hotels worldwide. Following its growth, the Ritz Carlton chain in the United States experienced a rapid decline. The Philadelphia hotel was converted into an office building and the Atlantic City hotel was sold. In 1951, the New York hotel was demolished to make way for an office building, leaving only the Boston location.

=== Later operations ===
In 1982, Blakely licensed the Ritz-Carlton name to hotelier John Bennett Coleman for two hotels Coleman was renovating, The Fairfax in Washington, D.C., and the Navarro at 112 (now 110) Central Park South in New York City. Coleman renamed them the Ritz-Carlton Washington, D.C., and the Ritz-Carlton New York in April 1982. The two hotels eventually joined the modern chain that would be founded a few years later. Ritz-Carlton's management of the New York hotel ended in 1997, with the hotel joining the Sheraton chain and becoming a Westin, and later an InterContinental. The building was converted to a luxury co-op in 2006.

In 1999 Ritz-Carlton acquired the former Hotel St. Moritz in New York City. It was extensively renovated and re-opened in 2002 as a luxury hotel and condominium complex called the Ritz-Carlton New York, Central Park.

== Architecture ==
The 1911 Ritz-Carlton’s New York, located in Midtown Manhattan, was designed by Warren and Wetmore and built in the Renaissance Revival style. The hotel was constructed as a replica of the Carlton Hotel in London.

On June 2, 1911, the New York Times announced a $1 million construction addition to the hotel. An 18-story structure was added to the main hotel, with a lower wing for a new ballroom with private dining rooms and a banquet hall. The addition increased the capacity of the hotel by about one-third.

In the late 19th century and early 20th century, large scale infrastructure projects emerged throughout the city, such as the Williamsburg Bridge and the New York City Subway system. Consumer culture boomed with the development of luxury department stores like Bergdorf Goodman and Bloomingdale's and mass amusement parks like Coney Island opened. It is in the context of New York City's rapid industrialization in Gilded Age America that the Ritz-Carlton New York hotel opened.

Between 1900 and 1915, the Midtown neighborhood was under constant construction. In addition to the Ritz-Carlton, many famous landmarks were constructed in Midtown in the same time period, including the Flatiron Building in 1902, Grand Central Terminal in 1913, and New York Public Library Main Branch in 1911. Although the hotel was demolished, the other buildings remain iconic pieces of New York Gilded Age Architecture.

== Notable figures ==
=== Guests ===
- Barbara Hutton: Born in New York and one of the wealthiest women in the world at this time period, her lavish debutante party was held in the ballroom at the Ritz-Carlton in 1930.
- Prince Paul Troubetzkoy: Russian prince and well-known sculptor, stayed at the Ritz-Carlton's New York location in July 1914. He notably requested accommodations for his two Russian shepherd dogs, but was refused.

=== Employees ===
- César Ritz: Swiss hotelier César Ritz established the Ritz-Carlton Hotel Company.
- Louis Diat: Served as the head chef of the Ritz-Carlton New York until its demolition. Diat was a culinary innovator best known for creating modern vichyssoise, a cold leek and potato soup, in 1917. He trained under César Ritz, and worked at the Ritz-Carlton New York’s Roof Garden restaurant, where he brought French culinary traditions to New York’s high society.
- Vincent Sardi Jr.: Trained at the Midtown hotel before working at his family’s famous Manhattan restaurant, Sardi’s.
