= Vichyssoise =

Type of cold soup

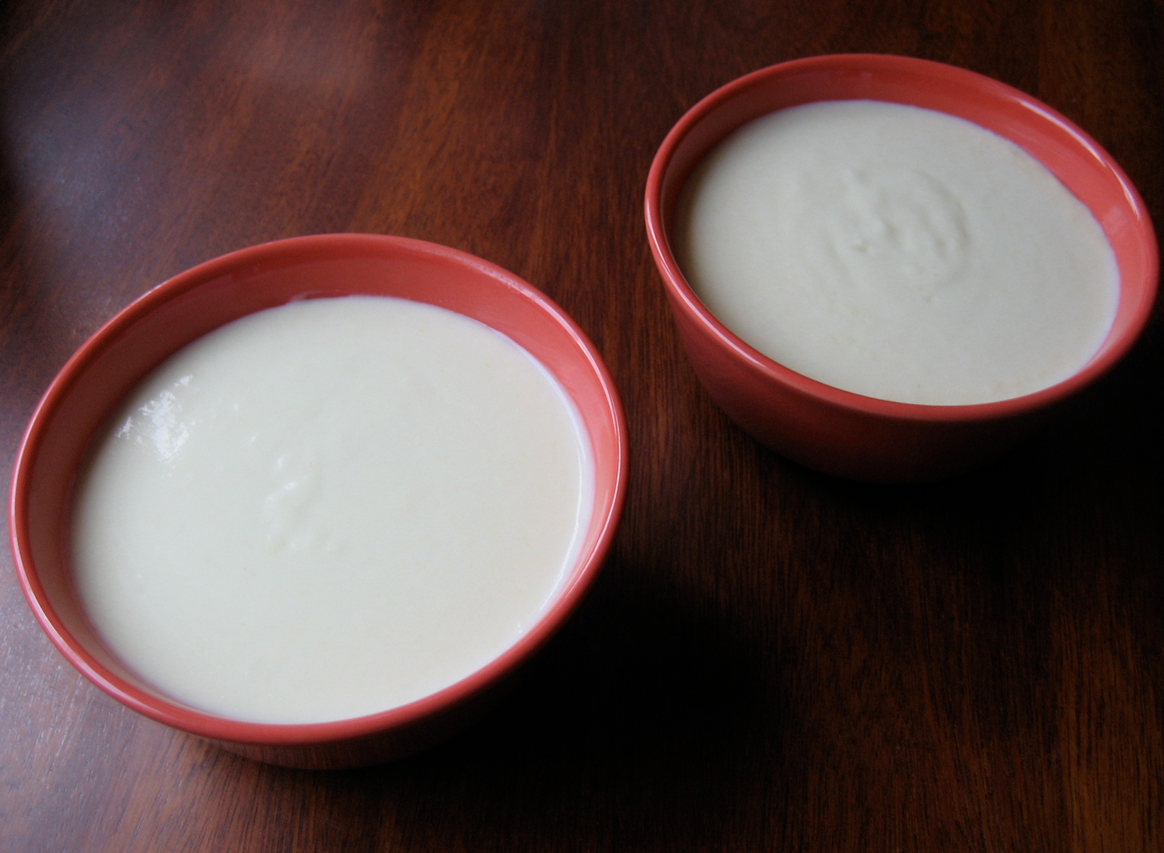
- Type: Soup
- Place of origin: France
- Created by: Louis Diat
- Serving temperature: Chilled
- Main ingredients: Leeks, onions, potatoes, cream

Vichyssoise (/ˌvɪʃiˈswɑːz/ VISH-ee-SWAHZ, French: [viʃiswaz]) is a soup made of cooked and puréed leeks, potatoes, onions and cream, chilled and garnished with chopped chives. It was invented in the first quarter of the 20th century by Louis Diat, a French-born cook working as head chef of the Ritz-Carlton Hotel in New York.

== History ==
=== Background ===
Leek and potato soup, often called potage Parmentier or potage à la Parmentier, is a staple of French cuisine. Elizabeth David (1984) comments that the ancestor of vichyssoise was "every French housewife's potato and leek soup".

=== Creation ===
Vichyssoise was the invention of the chef Louis Félix Diat at the Ritz-Carlton Hotel in New York, where he was head chef.

It is the most celebrated of the dishes Diat created at the Ritz-Carlton. In a book published posthumously, he explained the background:

I suspect that some of the fins becs [connoisseurs] who order it would be much surprised to learn of its humble origins as my mother's simple leek and potato soup. Casting about one day for a new cold soup, I remembered how maman used to cool our breakfast soup, on a warm morning, by adding cold milk to it. A cup of cream, an extra straining, and a sprinkle of chives, et voila, I had my new soup. I named my version of maman's soup after Vichy, the famous spa located not twenty miles from our Bourbonnais home, as a tribute to the fine cooking of the region.

Sources vary about when Diat first introduced vichyssoise to the menu of the Ritz-Carlton. Betty Fussell proposes 1910 as the year, although the hotel did not open until the following year. Several sources give the year as 1917, but there is no conclusive contemporary evidence for this. The soup was first mentioned in a French publication in 1923 in La Revue culinaire, which classified it as an item of American cuisine. It has never achieved the popularity in France that it has in the US and Britain.

== Ingredients ==
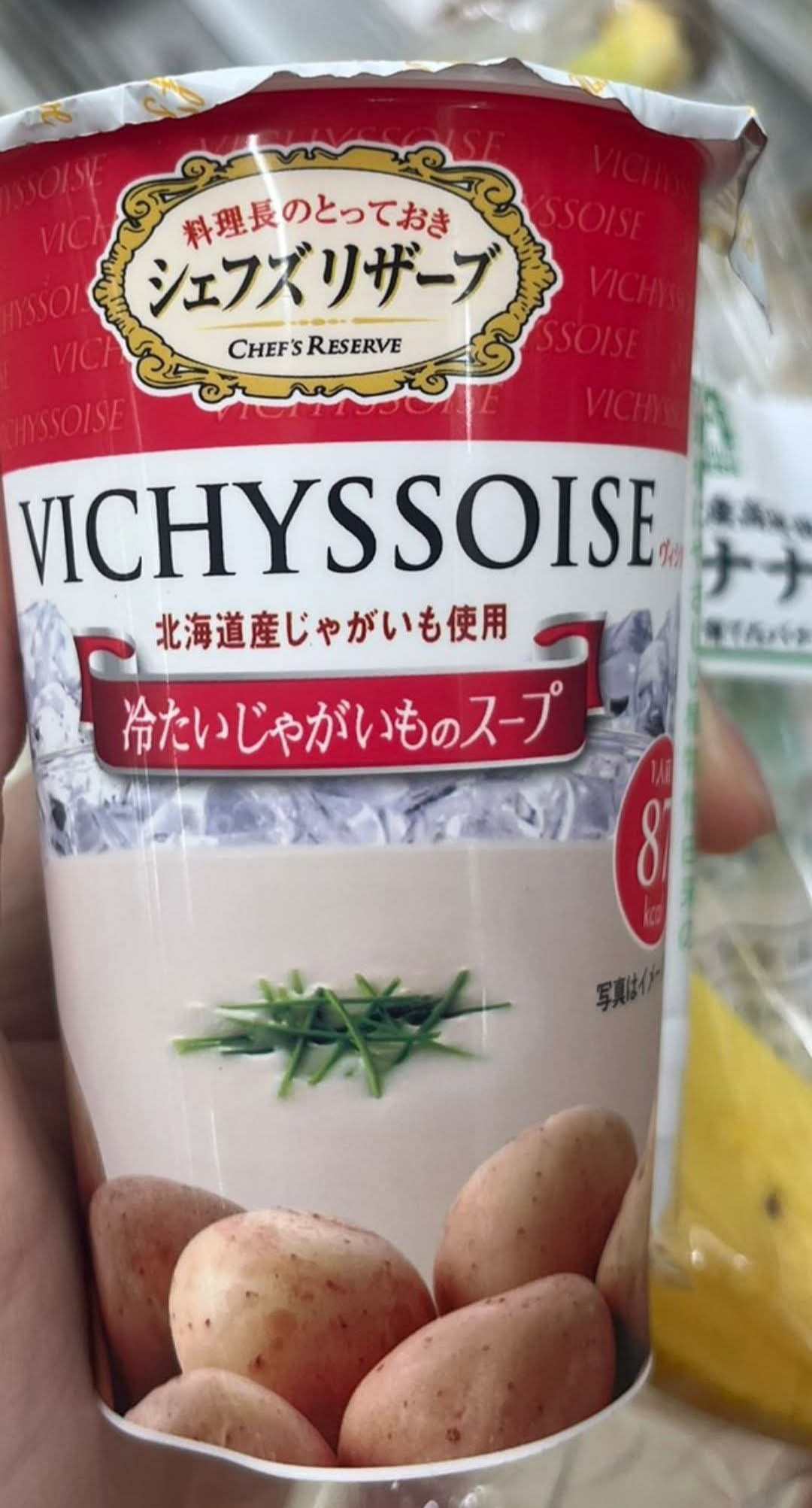
Vichyssoise soup sold in a Tokyo supermarket

Unlike long-familiar classic French dishes, the recipes for which vary from region to region and generation to generation, the creator's recipe for vichyssoise is set out in print. In Diat's Gourmet's Basic French Cookbook: Techniques of French Cuisine (1961) the ingredients are listed as potatoes, leeks and onions. They are cooked in light (single) cream and milk. The soup is chilled, and heavy (double) cream and chopped chives are added before serving.

Some later recipes stipulate, although Diat's does not, that only the white parts of the leeks should be used. Another important variant is the liquid in which the vegetables are simmered: rather than Diat's light cream and milk, chicken stock is specified in recipes by Simone Beck, Louisette Bertholle and Julia Child, in their Mastering the Art of French Cooking (1961), Craig Claiborne (1969), and Anne Willan (1994). Some recipes omit the onion, or add celery or dry white wine.

== Variants ==
Alan Davidson comments in The Oxford Companion to Food that vichyssoise is so well established that it is sometimes used as a generic term. He gives the example of "a vichyssoise of parsnip and runner beans"; and other published variations include apple vichyssoise, carrot vichyssoise, cucumber vichyssoise, lemon grass vichyssoise, and watercress vichyssoise (using vegetable stock). A completely vegan version dubbed "veggiesoise", using plant-based substitutes for chicken stock and cream, was published in 2005.

== See also ==
- List of cold soups
- List of French soups and stews
- List of soups
- List of vegetable dishes
- 1971 Bon Vivant botulism case, which involved tinned vichyssoise soup
