= Muhammad Kamaruzzaman =

Bangladeshi politician convicted of war crimes (1952–2015)

- মুহাম্মদ কামারুজ্জামান
- Born: 4 July 1952; Sajbarkhila, East Bengal, Dominion of Pakistan
- Died: 11 April 2015 (aged 62); Dhaka Central Jail, Dhaka, Bangladesh
- Education: Dhaka University (MA)
- Occupations: Politician, journalist
- Political party: Bangladesh Jamaat-e-Islami
- Spouse: Nurun Nahar
- Children: 5
- Status: Executed by hanging
- Conviction: Crimes against humanity
- Penalty: Death

Muhammad Kamaruzzaman (4 July 1952 – 11 April 2015) was a Bangladeshi politician and journalist who served as the senior assistant secretary general of Bangladesh Jamaat-e-Islami and was convicted of war crimes during the 1971 independence war of Bangladesh. He was executed by hanging at Dhaka Central Jail at 22:01 on 11 April 2015.

Besides his political career, Kamaruzzaman also was editor of the Weekly Sonar Bangla. On 9 May 2013, the International Crimes Tribunal sentenced him to death after it found Kamaruzzaman guilty of crimes against humanity including genocide, murder, rape, looting, arson, and deportation of people during the Bangladesh War of Independence. Kamaruzzaman denied all charges, stating they were politically motivated. The trial itself was criticized by international observers and opposition figures and was mired in controversies.

== Early life ==
Kamaruzzaman was born on 4 July 1952 at Sajbarkhila village in Sherpur Thana (at the time East Bengal, Dominion of Pakistan). His father Moulavi Insan Ali Sarker, was a businessman. Kamaruzzaman obtained a master's degree in journalism in 1976 from Dhaka University. He had five sons. He was married to Nurun Nahar.

== Political career ==
=== In 1971 ===
In 1971, Kamruzzaman was a college student. He was also alleged to be a member of the East Pakistan Islami Chattra Sangha in Mymensingh.

He was the chief organizer of the Al-Badr and pro-Pakistan militant groups, formed to assist the Pakistan Army to thwart the Bangladeshi independence movement in 1971 of greater Mymensingh. According to the Daily Sangram on 16 August 1971, Muhammad Kamruzzaman presided over a rally held at the local Muslim Institute in Mymensingh by the Al-Badr to mark the 25th independence day of Pakistan.

=== Post-independence ===
Kamaruzzaman was a two-time president of Islami Chhatra Shibir, the student wing of Bangladesh Jamaat-e-Islami. He became a journalist at the Weekly Sonar Bangla in 1981, later taking the role of editor. He also worked for The Daily Sangram as executive editor.

In four successive elections between 1991 and 2008 Kamaruzzaman unsuccessfully contested the seat Sherpur-1 for Jamaat-e-Islami, losing the last three times to the Awami League candidate Md. Atiur Rahman Atik.

== War criminal trial ==
Kamuruzzaman was initially arrested on 13 July 2010 and detained for over a year without being formally informed of charges. In November 2011, the United Nations Working Group on Arbitrary Detention adopted the opinion that the detention was disproportional and breached human rights conventions. Kamaruzzaman, along with nine other senior members from Jamaat-e-Islami, was charged on seven counts of crimes against humanity during the war in 1971, including genocide, murder, rape, looting, arson and deportation of unarmed civilians. He denied all charges, claiming they were politically motivated.

=== Charges ===
Kamaruzzaman was charged with the following war crimes:

- Killing of Badiuzzaman by Al-Badr, led by Kamaruzzaman on 29 June 1971;
- Torture of Lecturer Abdul Hannan by Kamaruzzaman and his associates in May 1971;
- Genocide of 120 men and rape of the women of Sohagpur village on 25 July 1971, planned and advised by Kamaruzzaman;
- Murder of Golam Mostafa by Al-Badr on Kamaruzzaman's orders on 23 August 1971;
- Killing of eight people from Chawkbazar by Al-Badr in Kamaruzzaman's presence at Sherpur in the middle of the Ramadan during the war;
- Repression of Didar and others in Mymensingh district in November 1971;
- Murder of five on the 27th day of Ramadan by the Al-Badr members following the orders of Kamaruzzaman.

=== Conviction and execution ===
The final arguments of the trial closed on 14 April 2013. On 9 May 2013, the International Crimes Tribunal found him guilty on five out of the seven counts, including torture, genocide, killings, rape, looting, arson, and deportation of unarmed civilians during the 1971 Liberation war of Bangladesh and sentenced him to death by hanging on two of the charges. Kamaruzzaman denied the charges saying the trial was politically motivated and appealed the verdict in the Supreme Court.

During the trial, Kamaruzzman had outbursts of anger and commented: "There is no instance in history that a higher secondary student has been tried for crimes against humanity." The court upheld the death sentence on the charge of the Sohagpur massacre. He filed a review petition which was dismissed by the appellate division of the Supreme Court.

Kamaruzzaman was executed on 11 April 2015 in Dhaka's Central Jail.

== Controversies ==
Although the government and ICT have stated that justice was the priority, opposition parties such as the Jamaat-e-Islami and the BNP accused then-Prime Minister Sheikh Hasina of using the tribunal for persecution. Human Rights Watch called the trial "seriously flawed".

=== 2012 Skype controversy ===
In December 2012, conversations and emails between the judge and a Brussels-based lawyer were published, which according to The Economist revealed that the government wanted a quick verdict from the International Crimes Tribunal. In response, an application was submitted on behalf of Kamaruzzaman for a retrial, which was rejected. Following the revelations, Justice Nizamul Huq resigned from the post and Fazle Kabir was appointed there.

== See also ==
- Abdul Quader Mollah
- Delwar Hossain Sayeedi
- Ghulam Azam
- List of Bangladeshi criminals
