= Louis Diat =

French-born American chef and culinary writer

Louis Félix Diat
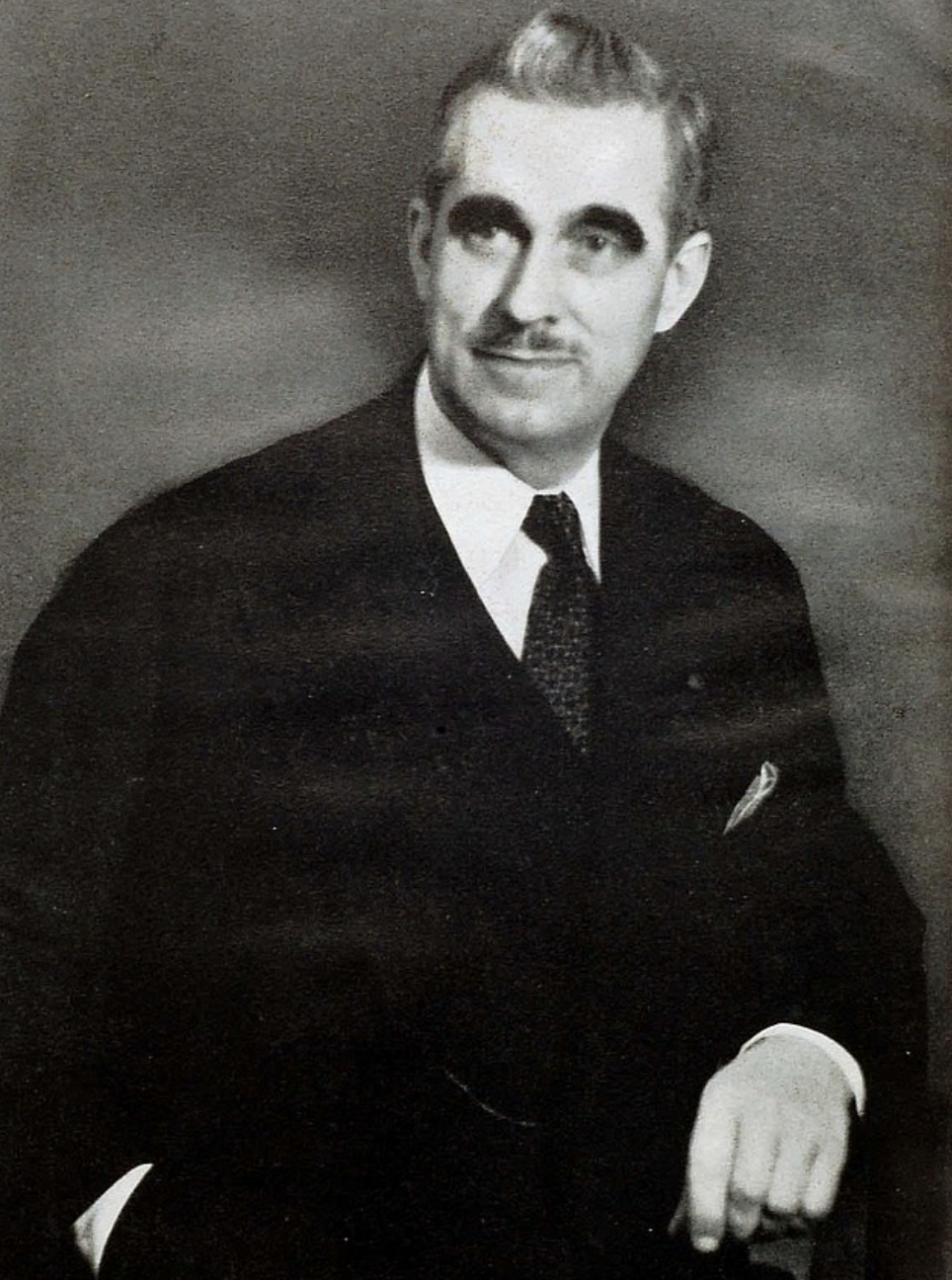
- Diat in 1926
- Born: 5 May 1885; Montmarault, France
- Died: 29 August 1957 (aged 72); New York City, New York, United States
- Occupations: Chef; Writer
- Organisation: The Ritz-Carlton Hotel Company
- Notable work: Louis Diat's Home Cookbook: French Cooking for Americans Gourmet's Basic French Cookbook Cooking a la Ritz Sauces, French and Famous

Louis Félix Diat (May 5, 1885 – August 29, 1957) was a French-born American chef and culinary writer. It is also believed that he created vichyssoise soup during his time at the Ritz-Carlton.

== Biography ==
Born in France ... naturalized thirty years ago as an American citizen ... ardently democratic in his sympathies today ... M. Diat is one of the most famous among the clever chefs of America. He is a tall, slender, courtly man—very handsome with his iron-gray hair, heavy black brows, and dark, luminous eyes. Kindly, diffident in manner, he is nevertheless an exacting boss over the maze of kitchens, pantries and storerooms and the small army that mans them. He is also an enthusiast for American food.

— Demelria Taylor of Los Angeles Times, 3 January 1943

=== Childhood ===
Diat was born in 1885 in France, where his father managed a shoe store. During the summer, when Diat and his siblings desired a cold snack, Diat's mother Annette often poured milk into leftover potato-and-leek soup (potage bonne femme).

At age five, Diat learned to cook. At age eight, he awoke early before school to cook soup. He observed the cooking of his mother and grandmother. His mother taught him tarts, while his grandmother demonstrated how to broil chicken over charcoal. By age 13, Diat resolved to become a chef, and by 14, he entered into an apprenticeship in a patisserie in nearby Moulins.

=== Culinary profession ===
At 18, he spent tours of duty at Paris' Hôtel Le Bristol Paris and L'Hotel Du Rhin. Diat was appointed chef potager (soup chef) in 1903 at Hôtel Ritz Paris. In 1906, at 21, he transferred to The Ritz Hotel London, where he held the same position and also aided the main sauce maker. At both locations, Diat was coached by founder César Ritz.

On October 8, 1910, aged 25, Diat immigrated to New York, becoming the chef of Carlton House on 23 October 1910 and about 7 weeks later the head chef of the newly opened Ritz-Carlton in Manhattan. The first week of November, Diat applied to be a citizen of the United States. Diat served as the chef de cuisine at the Ritz-Carlton's roof-garden restaurant. Auguste Escoffier oversaw the inauguration of the restaurant. Diat invented a novel recipe every summer for the sultry climate.

[A] tall, slim, handsome man with thick gray hair and wide, bushy eyebrows. He was a master in the kitchen who was always willing to stop cooking long enough to talk about it in an interpretive and fascinating manner.

— Jane Nickerson of The New York Times, 4 September 1957

During his 41-year stint at the Ritz-Carlton, he cooked for King Edward VIII as the Prince of Wales; other nobles like queens, prime ministers, and ambassadors; and on one occasion, the exclusive wine club Confrérie des Chevaliers du Tastevin ("Knights of the Wine Cup"). He "worked fourteen hours a day, six days a week, and spent seven or eight hours at the hotel on Sunday, his day off". According to Lawrence, Diat was the supervisor of 150 chefs. "Formidable" yet benign, Diat served as the kitchen mediator and first aid expert in the case of injuries. Diat forbade the use of substitutes in food, and rejected the proposition of a canned version of vichyssoise.

Diat typically reached his office by 8:15 am and spent slightly over an hour ordering goods. For the remainder of the morning, he supervised and advised his kitchen staff and confirmed the menus. In the afternoon, he wrote in his office.

Diat taught cooking classes in the kitchens. Some of his students became chefs at other hotels in New York, Washington, D.C., and Colorado. Diat received a visit from the president of the Campbell's, Arthur Dorance, who stayed at the Ritz for half a year to learn Diat's soup making techniques. In 1938, Diat won the distinguished Chevalier du Mérite Agricole "for having done so much to bring an important element of culture and civilization to the United States". In 1947, Diat became the in-house chef of Gourmet. Diat was included in a list of chefs with annual salaries of $10,000 to $25,000.

=== Later years ===
I have been invited to go to the new Carlton House as supervising chef, but I don't know. I will go away for at least six months, either to California or to France, to forget about the Ritz. I don't want to be in New York when they break this place up. When Queen Marie of Romania came here for a supper party in the Oval Room, she said, "Oh, it is like my palace!"

— Louis Diat before demolition

On 2 May 1951, the Ritz-Carlton closed for demolition. Diat prepared a "farewell luncheon" for the kitchen personnel. Diat retired, returning to his home in Hartsdale, where he spent the rest of his life writing cookbooks. On 29 August 1957, Diat died in New York Hospital aged 72.

== Invention of vichyssoise ==
In 1917, (Note: The date of Diat's invention of vichyssoise is given as either 1917 or 1910. One publication reported that vichyssoise was invented in 1917 for a function commemorating the inaugural issue of Vanity Fair. Vanity Fair reported that it was created in June 1917 for the inauguration of the hotel restaurant.) seeking to "invent some new and startling cold soup" for the menu at the Ritz-Carlton, he recalled his mother's soup. His experimenting soon led to a combination of "leeks, onions, potatoes, butter, milk, cream and other seasonings". Diat named it "crème vichyssoise glacée" (chilled cream vichyssoise), after Vichy, a spa town near his birthplace in France that is famous for both its exceptional food and its springs. The new item enjoyed "instant success". Charles M. Schwab was the first to sample vichyssoise and requested another serving.

Vichyssoise was served the rest of the summer and the following summers. During the colder seasons, he did not include it in the menu, but so many people asked for it, in 1923, Diat placed it on the menu full-time. Diat recalled that Sara Roosevelt had had vichysoisse and "once called me up at five in the afternoon and asked me to send eight portions to her house".

When Diat had no access to leeks in his cooking, his vexation prompted the produce stocker to find a Long Island farmer to cultivate a small yield.

== Personal life ==
Diat and his wife Suzanne had one child, a daughter, Suzette. Between 1916 and 1929, the family lived in New Rochelle, N.Y. Between 1929 and January 1950, they lived in a small apartment on Manhattan's Central Park West. Thereafter, Diat and his wife lived in Hartsdale, in Westchester County, N.Y.

Suzette Diat married George J. Lawrence, with whom she had two children. In an interview, Suzette Diat Lawrence described her father as "a gentle, humble man, simple in his tastes. ... He enjoyed good cooking. It didn't have to be fancy as long as it was prepared well without too much seasoning and not too rich". She considered her father a patient instructor, "He would answer any question concerned with cooking. He had no secrets." Additionally, Diat "taught his family the art of using leftovers" to create new dishes.

Diat's two brothers also distinguished themselves in the culinary field. Jules Diat was a teacher. His son (Louis's nephew) was chef saucier (sauce chef) at the 1939 New York World's Fair. A participant in the French Resistance during World War II, he was killed by the Germans. Lucien Diat, younger than Louis by seventeen years, was the renowned executive chef at Plaza Athénée hotel in Paris and also the teacher of Jacques Pépin.

== Writer ==
The recipes take care and time in amounts seldom expended. Nevertheless he has provided fine guidance for those ready to follow and he has an inspiring approach for those who don't know their own possibilities.

— Lois Palmer of The New York Times, 12 May 1946

Aside from writing magazine features for Gourmet, Diat also authored some cookbooks. He collaborated with Helen E. Ridley, a home economist and administrator of the J. Walter Thompson Company. (Note: The J. Walter Thompson Company was the publicity firm for the Ritz.) She reminisced, "Louis always thought the United States had a magnificent supply of really fine foods, that there was no place in Europe that could rival it in the variety and quality of available ingredients."

Cooking à la Ritz (Note: This was published in 1941 by J. B. Lippincott & Co. It is no longer in print.) included Diat's recipe for vichyssoise, along with other dishes he created during his time at the Ritz-Carlton.

In Louis Diat's French Cookbook for Americans, (Note: This was published in 1946 by J. B. Lippincott & Co. and later renamed to Home Cook Book: French Cooking for Americans) Diat compared cooking in the United States with cooking in France. He noted that the key to cooking is appeal. "[Americans] could do it as well as the French, but one has to be interested. In France girls of 11 already are able to prepare meals from watching and helping their mothers. It's early training that does it". Diat proceeded to discuss meat, gravies, fish, and salads. Finally, he added that "fine cooking is the basis of a happy life ... Men like to eat well ... so if you want to keep your husband home, learn to be a good cook." Many of the recipes in this book are derived from the meals Diat's mother cooked. Diat alleged that American women cannot cook since they "often ruin good food trying to save" money or time. In response to this dilemma, Diat wrote a book entitled La Cuisine de Ma Mère to divulge all his "cooking secrets". Diat suggests that they "approach their cooking with imagination, interest and an eye for artistic effects". Ascribing his culinary finesse to his mother, Diat dedicated the book to his mother, "Annette Alajoinine Diat, who guided the early years, inspired the later ones and whose memory is still a spur".

In Sauces: French and Famous (1951), Diat discussed how to make the sauces bechamel, brown sauce, tomato sauce, and mayonnaise. He also included a narration of his eating habits. Diat also wrote French Cooking for the Home (1956) and Gourmet's Basic French Cookbook (1961).

== In popular culture ==
Louis Diat was also depicted in Season One, Episode 23 of popular anime series Food Wars!, where he is referenced due to his creation of vichyssoise.
