= Sohagpur massacre =

1971 mass killings in East Pakistan

Sohagpur Massacre
- Bidhabapalli Massacre
- Part of 1971 Bangladesh genocide
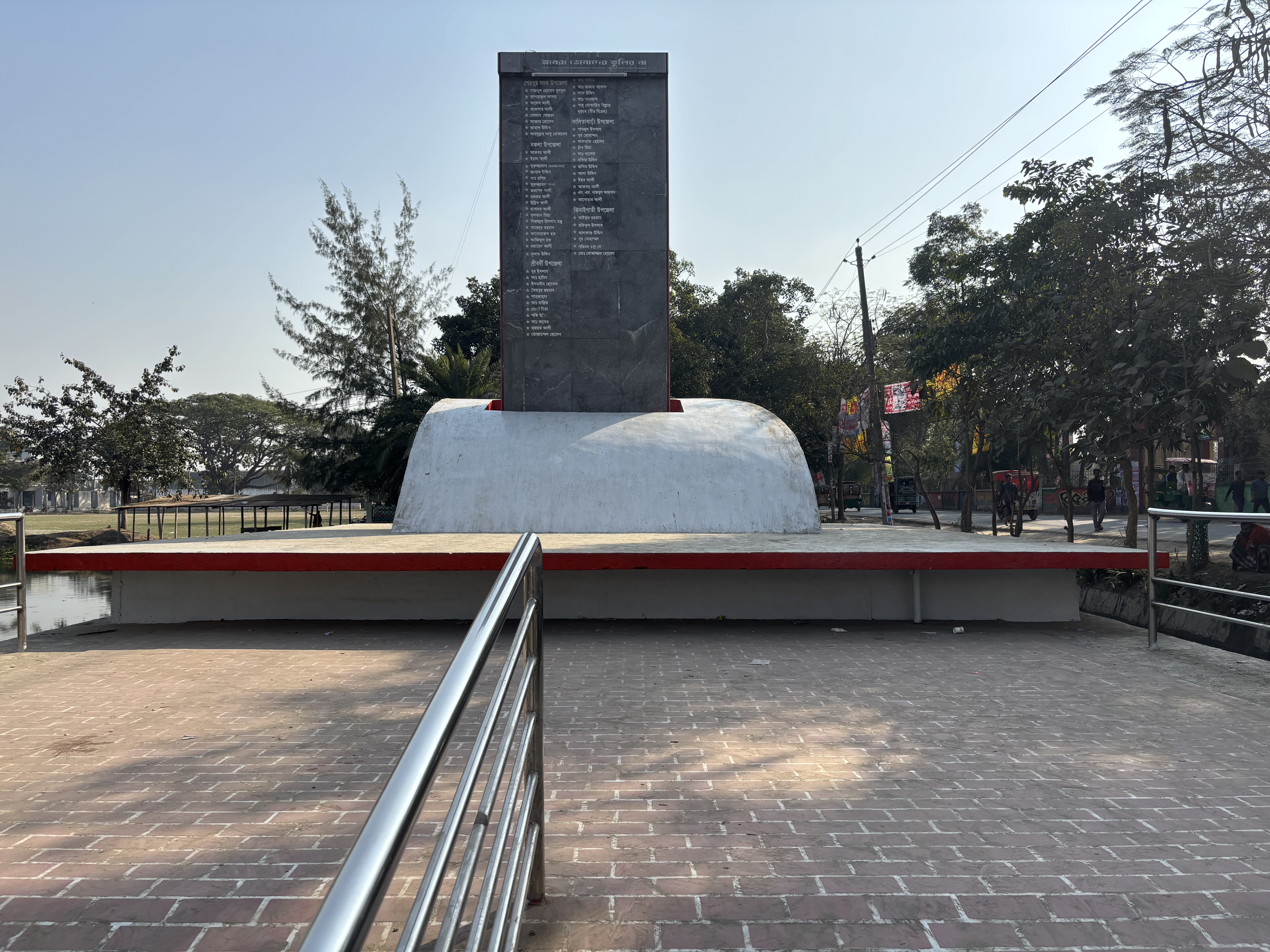

- Sohagpur massacre (Bangladesh)
- Native name: সোহাগপুর গণহত্যা
- Location: 25.1228673°N 90.2602678°E; Sohagpur, Nalitabari, Sherpur, Bangladesh
- Date: 10 Srabon, 1378 BS (25 July 1971); 07:00 – 09:00 (UTC+6)
- Target: Bengali and Garo people
- Attack type: Massacre
- Deaths: 187
- Perpetrators: Al-Badr; Razakar; Pakistan Army
- No. of participants: 150+
- Motive: To eradicate the freedom fighters

The Sohagpur massacre was a mass killing of 187 civilians on 25 July 1971 in the Mymensingh District of East Pakistan (now Bangladesh) during the Liberation War. The massacre was perpetrated by the Pakistan Army and Al-Badr, a paramilitary force opposing Bangladeshi independence. Following the massacre, Sohagpur became known as the "village of widows."

== Background ==
After the outbreak of the Bangladesh Liberation War in East Pakistan in 1971, Sherpur District became a strategically important region due to its location near the border of the Garo Hills, Meghalaya, India. Pakistan Army and Mukti Bahini wrestled for control over the region till the end of the conflict.

Sohagpur is a village located 36 km from Sherpur town. According to the witness statement of Arshed Ali, the son of one of the victims of the massacres in the Sherpur area, Pakistan Army killed 245 civilians in the villages of Sohagpur, Benupara and Kakorkandi on 25 July 1971. The army was aided by local collaborators Muhammad Kamaruzzaman, Chairman Fassi, Nazir Master, Doctor Kader, Bollu Boka Bura and Nasa. Muhammad Kamaruzzaman was later convicted of multiple counts of crimes against humanity including the Sohagpur massacre, and was sentenced to death in 2013.

According to one local account, the attack was prompted by Doctor Kader, the village doctor who became influential during the war through his collaboration with the Pakistan army. He started extorting the villagers and the refugees making their way to the border through the village. One day the hut where he kept his plunder was broken into. An infuriated Kader headed to the Pakistan army camp and convinced them that the village housed a camp for Mukti Bahini and the army must take action against it.

== Massacre ==
On the morning of 25 July 1971, Muhammad Kamaruzzaman of the Al-Badr and Doctor Kader, of the Razakar, led Pakistan Army to the village. At the time of the massacre, there was no Mukti Bahini presence in the village of Sohagpur; the nearest position was in Baruajani, another village near Sohagpur, but the army was led to believe (by Kader) that Sohagpur was a stronghold of the Mukti Bahini. A 150-strong army surrounded the village from three sides at 7am (UTC+6) when most of the male villagers were busy tending to the Amon (rice) crop in the fields. The army opened fire on the villagers and by 9 am had killed more than 150 villagers. The soldiers continued their search for Mukti Bahini soldiers for another twelve hours, during which they dragged any male villager taking refuge in their homes and shot or bayonetted them to death in front of their families. Two people from the village protested against the Pakistan Army and were shot dead. Among the minority Garo people, who are Indigenous in the region, three peasants working in the fields were killed. Thirteen women of the village were physically assaulted as well.

The survivors of the village fled to India. The survivors returned after the Pakistan Army withdrew from the village. No men survived the genocide. Razakars and Al-Badr forces then declared those killed in the massacre "Kafir" (infidels) and prevented the burial of their bodies. Many of their corpses were eaten by wild animals. However, some people were able to bury the bodies of their relatives. Jalal Uddin, the president of the village organization named Martyr family welfare association and the son of a victim of the massacre, was 14 years old at the time of the massacre. Fifty years after the massacre, in an interview with the Dhaka Post, the survivor said:

সে সময়ের নির্মমতা ও ভয়াবহতার কথা বলতে গেলে আমার শরীরের লোমগুলো দাঁড়িয়ে যায়। পাকবাহিনী এলাকায় প্রবেশ করে অনবরত গুলি করতে থাকে। তারা আমাদের বাড়িতে এসে বাবা, ভাইসহ সকলকে হত্যা করে। আমি দৌড়ে ঘরের মাচার মধ্যে লুকিয়ে নিজেকে রক্ষা করি। সোহাগপুরের কোনো পুরুষ বেঁচে ছিল না, আমি ছাড়া। তাই আমাকেই লাশগুলো একত্র করে মাটি চাপা দিতে হয়েছে। জানাজা করার মতো লোক ছিল না।

Speaking of the brutality and horror of that time, it gives me a scary feeling in my body. The Pakistan Army entered the area and started firing incessantly. They came to our house and killed everyone, including my father and brother. I ran and hid in the scaffolding of the house to save myself. There was no man left in Sohagpur except me, so I had to collect the corpses and bury them. There was no one to perform the funeral.

— Jalal Uddin, in an interview with the Dhaka Post

== Aftermath ==
After the independence of Bangladesh, Sohagpur was renamed to Bidhbapara. Later, the name was changed to Bidhabapalli (lit. 'the village of widows'). In 1991, Matia Chowdhury became an MP in the constituency Sherpur-2. After being elected as an MP, she told the story of the widows of the village. Five years later, the Awami League-led government began to aid the village's widows in various ways. The caretaker government later ran a mushroom and agricultural project to help widows, which is currently closed. Widows' allowances are paid from BRAC Bank and Trust Bank. However, Deutsche Welle reported in 2015 that the condition of the ones affected had not improved. The president of the village organization said that no one in the village could be educated. According to report of Janakantha in 2021, land and houses have been given as gifts to the affected widows by the government.

In 2010s, many responsible for the massacre had still not been prosecuted. In 2010, the Bangladesh government had filed a case against Muhammad Kamaruzzaman at the International Criminal Tribunal, accusing him of seven counts, including the attack on the village. The court sentenced Kamaruzzaman to death on 9 May 2013; he was executed on 11 April 2015. However, Kamaruzzaman's son Hassan Iqbal pleaded not guilty to the charges, saying his father was not in the village at the time of the murder and that his father had been deliberately implicated. In 2012, Kamaruzzaman's brother had asked Arshed Ali to testify on behalf of him. Ali testified for the International Crimes Tribunal on 2 March 2013. He denied Kamruzzaman's accusation and said that Kamruzzaman was not responsible for the massacre. He claimed that only Chairman Fassi, Nazir Master, Kadir and Nasa Gang were responsible for the massacre. Human Rights Watch called the trial of Bangladesh's International Criminal Tribunal "flawed" and said the trial was not impartial and there was no opportunity to appeal the verdict.

In 2016, the government of Bangladesh recognized six widows of the village as Mukti Bahini. The same year, the village was renamed to Birakanya Palli (lit. 'Village of heroic daughters') by the Sector Commander Forum’s leaders at a program in the village. On 19 February 2022, a memorial called Saurjaya was erected in the village to commemorate the Sohagpur massacre. 25 July, the day of the massacre is observed as 'Sohagpur massacre day'.
