= Boro Sazzad =

Bangladeshi gangster

- বড় সাজ্জাদ
- Born: Sazzad Ali Khan/Sazzad Hosain Khan; March 10, 1979 (age 47); Chittagong, Bangladesh
- Successor: Choto Sazzad
- Status: Fugitive (Red Notice from Interpol)
- Criminal charges: Leading an organized criminal network in Chittagong extortion targeted killings armed violence

Sazzad Ali Khan or Sazzad Hossain Khan, commonly known as Boro Sazzaad (literal meaning: Senior Sazzad), is a Bangladeshi fugitive gangster from Chittagong. He has been accused by law enforcement of leading an organized criminal network of around 50 hitman in Chittagong, with alleged involvement in extortion, targeted killings, armed violence, and related offences. An Interpol Red Notice has been issued for his arrest.

== Early life ==
According to police sources Sazzad, born as Sazzad Ali, is the son of contractor Abdul Gani from Chalitetali in Bayezid Bostami Thana of Chittagong city. He resided in this area before fleeing to India following bail from court in 2004.

== Early criminal activities ==
=== Assassination of Liakat ===
Sazzad emerged as a figure associated with criminal activities following the alleged murder of a ward councillor named Liakat Ali Khan outside his residence on 2 June 1999. He was arrested in the case in same year but was acquitted of charges due to a lack of witnesses.

=== Eight murder of Chittagong ===
Sazzaad was accused of leading an attack in the Bahaddarhat area of Chittagong. The incident occurred on 12 July 2000, where several gunmen ambushed a microbus carrying activists of the Bangladesh Chhatra League on their way to a rally, killing eight people at the scene. The incident became known as the “Eight Murder” case.

== Recent criminal activities ==
Following the resignation of Sheikh Hasina on 5 August 2024, reports indicated a resurgence of criminal activities linked to Boro Sazzad and his associates including 10 cases of targeted killings, public shootings, and extortion-related attacks across areas such as Bayezid, Chandgaon, and Panchlaish. Several of these incidents were connected to extortion networks, with violence often used to enforce demands. Police investigations also identified an organized structure within the group, involving multiple tiers of operatives responsible for planning, execution, and logistical support. In 2025 and 2026, a number of suspected associates were arrested with firearms, and authorities linked them to cases of murder, robbery, and organized extortion. Despite these actions, Sazzad denies all accusation and is reported to remain outside Bangladesh, with authorities indicating that he continues to influence operations through intermediaries.

In January and February 2026, the residence of businessman Mostafizur Rahman, chairman of Smart Group, was attacked by armed assailants allegedly instructed by Sazzad in Chandanpura area of Chittagong city. Though no casualties were reported. Sazzad had reportedly demanded BDT 10 crore and later reduced the demand to BDT 5 crore in an extortion attempt. The house had already been placed under police protection before the second attack. Before the latest attack, Rahman said he received a threatening WhatsApp message saying “wait and see,” and CCTV footage later showed four masked men carrying firearms, including pistols, a submachine gun, a Chinese rifle, and a shotgun.

Two rival gangs were formed by Akbar Ali, known as Dhakaiya Akbar (literal meaning: Akbar from Dhaka), and Sarwar Hossain Babla—both former associates of Boro Sazzad. In 2025, the leaders of both factions were killed within a span of six months, allegedly on Sazzad's orders. Dhakaiya Akbar was killed on 23 May 2025 in the western point of the Patenga Sea Beach, while he was socialising with friends. On 5 November 2025, Sarwar was shot dead during an election campaign of Chittagong-8 in Panchlaish area of the city. Ershad Ullah, the MP candidate of Bangladesh National Party was also injured during the shooting.

== Associates ==
=== David Emon ===
In July 2026, Mubarak Hossain Emon (also known as David Emon), allegedly a 'top terror' of Chittagong and an associate of Boro Sajjad, demanded a one-time extortion payment of Tk 20 million and a monthly payment of Tk 1 million from Chattogram-based internet service provider Digital Dot Net (DDN). After the company refused to pay, around 30–35 masked attackers vandalized DDN's office and looted cash and valuables. Emon was arrested on 29 July 2026 from Jessore while escaping the country.

=== Choto Sazzad ===
Sajjad Hossain known as Choto Sajjad (lit. meaning: Junior Sajjad) is an associate of Boro Sazzad currently detained by police. He has been indicted in 19 cases by police including murder and extortion.

== Warrants and arrests ==
Sazzad was arrested by Bangladesh police in Chittagong in 2000, reportedly with an AK-47 rifle. He was released on bail in 2004 and he fled to India via Dubai. In 2012, he was arrested again from Amritsar, Panjab in India. Bangladesh authorities later sought his extradition, but these efforts were unsuccessful. He faces multiple arrest warrants in Bangladesh on charges of murder, illegal arms possession, and extortion. In 2012, Bangladesh Police requested international assistance through Interpol, which issued a Red Notice against him. After spending several years in detention, he was released on bail from Tihar Jail in Delhi and is believed to be residing in India.
