= Jack Box =

- The "CEO" of Jack in the Box, Jack Box.
- First appearance: 1951 (original); 1994 (current)
- Created by: Robert O. Peterson
- Portrayed by: Dean Baker (1994–1999); Bob Thompson (1999–2004); John Glenn (2004–2014); David Tompkins (2014–present); Peter Sittig (puppet)
- Voiced by: Paul Winchell (1971-76); Rick Sittig (1994–2015); David Tompkins (2015–present) (English); Horacio Mancilla (Spanish)

In-universe information
- Full name: Jack I. Box
- Gender: Male
- Occupation: Founder, CEO, and spokesman for the Jack in the Box fast food chain, owner of the Carnivores football team, U.S. Presidential candidate, former guitarist for Meat Riot
- Family: Unnamed father, Patty Box (mother)
- Spouse: Cricket Box (wife)
- Children: Jack Jr. (son), Jane (daughter), Jake (son)
- Relatives: Jim (cousin), Jacques (cousin), Joey (cousin), Joey, Jr. (first cousin once removed), Horatio Box (ancestor)

Jack Box (full name Jack I. Box or simply known as Jack) is the primary mascot of the Jack in the Box fast food restaurant chain. In television commercials, he is the founder, CEO and ad spokesman for the chain. His appearance is that of a typical white male, with the exception of his spherical white head, blue dot eyes, conical black pointed nose and curvilinear red smile. He is most of the time seen wearing his trademark yellow clown cap and business suit.

The company has used the Jack Box mascot in its advertising since 1994 and has won a number of advertising awards for the long campaign.

== History ==
Prior to 1980, the chain used Jack as its symbol, which sat atop the drive-thru menus in the 1960s and early 1970s. Jack's head was also atop the large signs at each location. In 1980, the chain decided to establish a more "mature" image by introducing a wider variety of menu items and (most notably) discontinuing the use of Jack. A series of television commercials announced that "now we stand for great new food", to which the commercials showed the dramatic destruction of the notorious clown heads (most commonly through explosion, also dropping them from a crane and launching them like a rocket). Throughout the late 1980s to the 1990s, Jack in the Box tried to position itself as a premium fast food alternative, with varying results.

In 1993, a major food contamination crisis was linked to Jack in the Box restaurants. By 1994, a series of lawsuits and negative publicity took their tolls and pushed their corporate parent, Foodmaker Inc. to the verge of bankruptcy. In the short term, they decided to promote their initiatives on food safety. Management then approved a new guerilla advertising campaign created by Richard "Rick" Sittig, then working at the TBWA\Chiat\Day ad agency in Santa Monica, California. The concept brought back the original company mascot, Jack, but now in the form of a savvy and no-nonsense businessman who happened to have an enormous round clown head.

A series of new commercials featured a new and more serious Jack with a smaller head and wearing a business suit (according to him, "thanks to the miracle of plastic surgery"). In the very first of these new commercials, he blew up the board of directors as retribution for his supposed destruction in 1980 (using the 7-note musical signature in its previous campaign as a tribute). The intent of the ad campaign was to prove to a wary public that the company was no longer the same restaurant chain plagued by the food safety scandal; since the commercials had a definite humorous element to them that undermined the alleged "retribution" that Jack was supposedly demonstrating, the public responded positively. Car antenna ornaments modeled after Jack's head became a mainstay of the restaurant chain's promotion for several years.

== Fictional biography ==
The company's "biography" of him claims the following facts:

- According to his California driver's license, Jack I. Box is 6'8" tall and weighs 195 pounds. It also shows his birthday to be May 16.
- Jack was born on a cattle ranch in Colorado. He later moved to Southern California, where he met his blonde wife, Cricket, played by model Laura Dunn (1996–2010) and Gillian Vigman (2010–present). They now have a young son named Jack Jr. (who, like all males in the Box family tree, also has an oversized bald head). However, in May 2010, Jack appeared in a new commercial with a woman that did not resemble Cricket, who appeared with him in a commercial in 1997. The pair took in a movie where Jack complained and cried about the price of popcorn in relation to his low-priced menu. Jack revealed to his son that he really met Cricket at a concert at the Oracle Arena in Oakland, CA where Jack's heavy metal band, Meat Riot was playing their one hit wonder song, "Hot Mess" which was the opening act.
- Jack is an alumnus of Ball State University, a reference to his ball-shaped head.
- Jack, fluent in English, Spanish and Chinese, has starred in more than 300 television and radio commercials, including more than 100 Spanish-language ads. Jack's linguistic talents also include Mandarin, which he spoke in the 1999 television ad "Titans."
- Jack ran for president in 1996 and beat out Bill Clinton, Bob Dole and Dogbert in a national independent Virtual Vote poll; no recounts were required.
- During Super Bowl XXXV, Jack in the Box debuted a television commercial in which Jack announced his purchase of a professional American football team, the Carnivores. His team played against teams such as the Tofu Eaters and the Vegans.

== Other facts and family members ==
- In late 2009, the company began to run a commercial in which Jack visited his cousin Jim, who was serving time in prison. Jim has a large white head that resembles a Ping-Pong ball squashed from both sides (similar in shape to a peanut shell), with wispy gray hair and beard, along with a surly voice and facial expression. Unlike his cousin, he does not wear a clown cap.
- In 2010, a commercial aired where Jack visits his mother Patty, a blond-haired human, talking about her clipping coupons; at the end of the ad, Jack's father (who has a normal body, and a white head which resembles an egg, with wispy grey hair on his temples) comes in, saying "Patty, call the doctor; it's been more than 4 hours" (implying that he suffers from erectile dysfunction). Jack then says he has to leave.
- In late 2012, a commercial introduced Jack's cousin Joey and his son Joey Jr., who live in Philadelphia. Both have large egg-shaped white heads, a slight upward curve to their noses, and brown hair in a mullet. Joey's wife has a normal head.
- Near the end of both 2013 and 2014, a series of commercials for the "Jack's Munchie Meal" combo featured a small puppet version of Jack interacting with a human late at night. Both spoke and acted as if they were under the influence of drugs.
- Jack's smile can change to reflect his mood (puzzlement, fear, etc.). During one commercial, in which he was playing Texas hold 'em against several celebrities, he made his eyes and mouth disappear completely. The announcer remarked, "Now that's a world-class poker face."

== 2009 Bus accident advertising campaign ==
On February 1, 2009, a new advertising campaign began with a Super Bowl ad that showed Jack being struck by a bus outside his corporate office. Along with his second in command, Phil. He was walking down the street, stating that he wants the public to know about the fact that the public can order anything on his menu, anytime. He states "For instance, breakfast all day, or maybe a burg-." At that moment, a bus is seen to strike Jack head on, as onlookers cringe and his hat knocked off. The ad ends with Jack lying on the ground badly injured while the paramedics are being summoned. Viewers were then directed to visit the website hangintherejack.com in order to check on his condition.

The next ad depicted Jack being checked into the hospital and being operated on as his heart stopped, as Doctor Robert Conely was talking about the a "midnight breakfast at Jack's" with Nurse O'Brien. It is also revealed that his large head did not fit into the CAT scan machine and that the doctors were using unprofessional equipment (Doctor Conely states at the end of the ad to give him a hot glue gun and a bonesaw).

The third ad then showed Jack in a coma and Phil volunteering to take his place at the company's head, despite Jack not being dead, he felt that he was close enough to death that he should prepare to step up. Dr. Conely even states that he might not live, all the while another assistant named Barbara is more positive about the situation, stating that Jack will recover.

The fourth and final ad showed Phil, after snapping his fingers, announcing that he was going to take over Jack in the Box. Jack, regaining awareness of his surrounding (albeit only listening and blurred vision), thinks to himself that Phil using most of his ideas is a good thing. However, Phil states that he intends to change the company name, to "Phil in the Box", going as far to hold up the future company logo. At that moment, Jack, enraged, suddenly wakes up and begins throttling Phil, stating that he will not let the name change occur and stating that he has work to do, all the while demanding his pants. The words "Jack's Back" then appear on the screen.

Shortly after the announcement, the company got rid of the old Jack in the Box logo and introduced a newer and more modernized logo, along with a redesigned website. The overall campaign was noted for its unusually extensive (for the time) use of social media to gain viewer impressions at a lower cost than traditional media.

== In other media ==
- The pilot episode of American Dad! shows Stan Smith falsely blaming a student body candidate at his son's school for having a sexual relationship with Jack. When his son, Steve states that he thought that Jack was in the basement of the Smith house, it cuts to houseguest Roger Smith finding Jack in the basement, tied up and stripped down to presumably nothing.
- The April 24, 2009 edition of the Adam Carolla Podcast featured Sittig, in character as Jack, involving a humorous discussion on other restaurant mascots (Ronald McDonald, The Burger King), the fast food business and general listener Q&A. In the podcast, Jack insinuates that The Burger King is bisexual, citing his attire (tights, felt shoes and a cape). Carolla jumps in with a tale of the King buying a drink for a male friend of his in Canada, though this claim cannot be verified.

== See also ==
- The Burger King
