= Lauren Rudolph E. coli case =

1992 death of a child from food poisoning

Lauren Beth Rudolph was a 6-year-old girl of San Diego, California and one of the victims of the 1992–1993 Jack in the Box E. coli outbreak.

== Lauren Rudolph ==
Lauren's mother, Roni Austin, worked in interior design and her father, Dick Rudolph, served in the napalm infantry during the Vietnam War. Roni and Dick separated after Lauren’s death; Roni is now remarried to Donn Austin, a computer specialist. Lauren had a brother who was eleven at the time of her death. Lauren was described by family as an active, healthy “girl’s girl” who loved pretty clothes.

== Sickness ==
On December 24, Lauren was kept home from school by her mother because of a slight fever, stomach cramps, and diarrhea. Roni suspected these were flu symptoms until blood started showing up in her diarrhea and Lauren became too weak to stand unaided; this is when Roni and Dick rushed her to the ER. Her parents and brother did not have any symptoms Lauren was experiencing, and by morning she was transferred to the ICU and doctors suspected based on her symptoms that her appendix had failed. She was given powerful pain killers to help her sleep so she could receive a barium test in the morning. Her parents went home to be with their son and get Lauren’s Christmas presents ready for the morning. This was when Roni found a note Lauren had written to Santa before leaving for the hospital that said, “I don’t feel so good. Please make me better for Christmas.”

The next morning Lauren opened a present, a Christmas dress, but was too weak to open any others, so her brother read stories and fed her ice chips until her barium test came back negative. Lauren began to feel weaker throughout the day, and most of her fluids were being administered through an IV. The next day, she suffered a heart attack, but the doctors were able to stabilize her and put her in a medically induced coma to prevent seizures and conserve her energy. Hours later the doctor reported to her parents that the heart attack had caused irreversible damage to her brain, and she would likely not be able to breathe on her own off life support. Her chances of survival were low, and if she did, she would not be the same girl she was before she got sick. On December 28, Roni and Dick made the choice to take her off life support. Lauren was buried in the Christmas dress that she opened while in the hospital.

== Death ==
At the time of her death, the doctors did not know that Lauren’s symptoms were consistent with those of E. coli poisoning. Her autopsy was performed by Dr. Glen Billman, the Associate Director at the Children’s Hospital, and he noticed that her medical recorded that Hemolytic-uremic syndrome was listed as a diagnostic consideration. Typical HUS is caused most commonly by Shiga toxin-producing Escherichia coli (STEC) which arises from consuming contaminated food or drink. Symptoms include bloody diarrhea, vomiting, fever, and abdominal pain, which are all consistent with Lauren’s symptoms. Approximately 10% of children who are infected with E. Coli O157 H:7, an STEC, develop HUS, and this can cause health complications such as diabetes, seizures, hypertensions, etc.

In the autopsy, he noticed that Lauren’s bowel was twice the size it should have been, and soft and discolored, and he could see an invasion of bacteria on her colon wall under a microscope. Billman had just come across medical research that identified E. coli as a cause for HUS, so these discoveries were raising red flags for him. He received her stool cultures from the lab, which tested positive for the presence of E. coli. The hospitals were in contact with the families of victims like Lauren trying to figure out why there was consistent cases of E. coli causing children to become ill. Through questioning and investigation Jack in the Box was linked to an Escherichia coli O157: H7, outbreak because of undercooked hamburger meat.

== Advocacy ==
Roni and Dick did not find out about the cause of Lauren’s death until late January when an article about the Jack in the box E. coli breakout (where Lauren was noted as a victim) was in the paper. Roni contacted her attorney, Rick Waite and provided Dick’s receipt from Jack in the Box from when he took Lauren out to eat as evidence. Roni sued Jack in the Box, winning a confidential settlement and cofounded Safe Tables Our Priority (S.T.O.P.) in 1994, a nonprofit advocacy group (rebranded to Stop Foodborne Illness in 2011). STOP’s advocacy has been at the forefront of food safety achievements such as the FDA requiring consumer health warning labels on unpasteurized juices in 1997 and the Lauren Beth Rudolph Food Safety act of 1997.

The Lauren Beth Rudolph Food Safety Act of 1997 (California Health and Safety Code 113996), introduced by Howard Kaloogian, made it illegal for undercooked animal-product food to be served in California. The act set minimum doneness temperatures for meat and eggs (ground meat at 157 degrees Fahrenheit, eggs and pork at 145 degrees Fahrenheit, fish and lamb at 140 degrees Fahrenheit, poultry or stuffed foods and reheated leftovers at 165 degrees Fahrenheit). It also sets the maximum holding temperature for a period over thirty minutes to 45 degrees Fahrenheit or lower for potentially hazardous foods. Roni believes that if this act was in place before Lauren had eaten her hamburger from Jack in the Box, she would still be alive today. Public knowledge about food safety and contamination by STECs and other pathogens will benefit society and allow for more regulation on the production, preparation, and storage of food to prevent the spreading of harmful E.coli.
