= William Marler =

American lawyer (born 1957)

William D. Marler
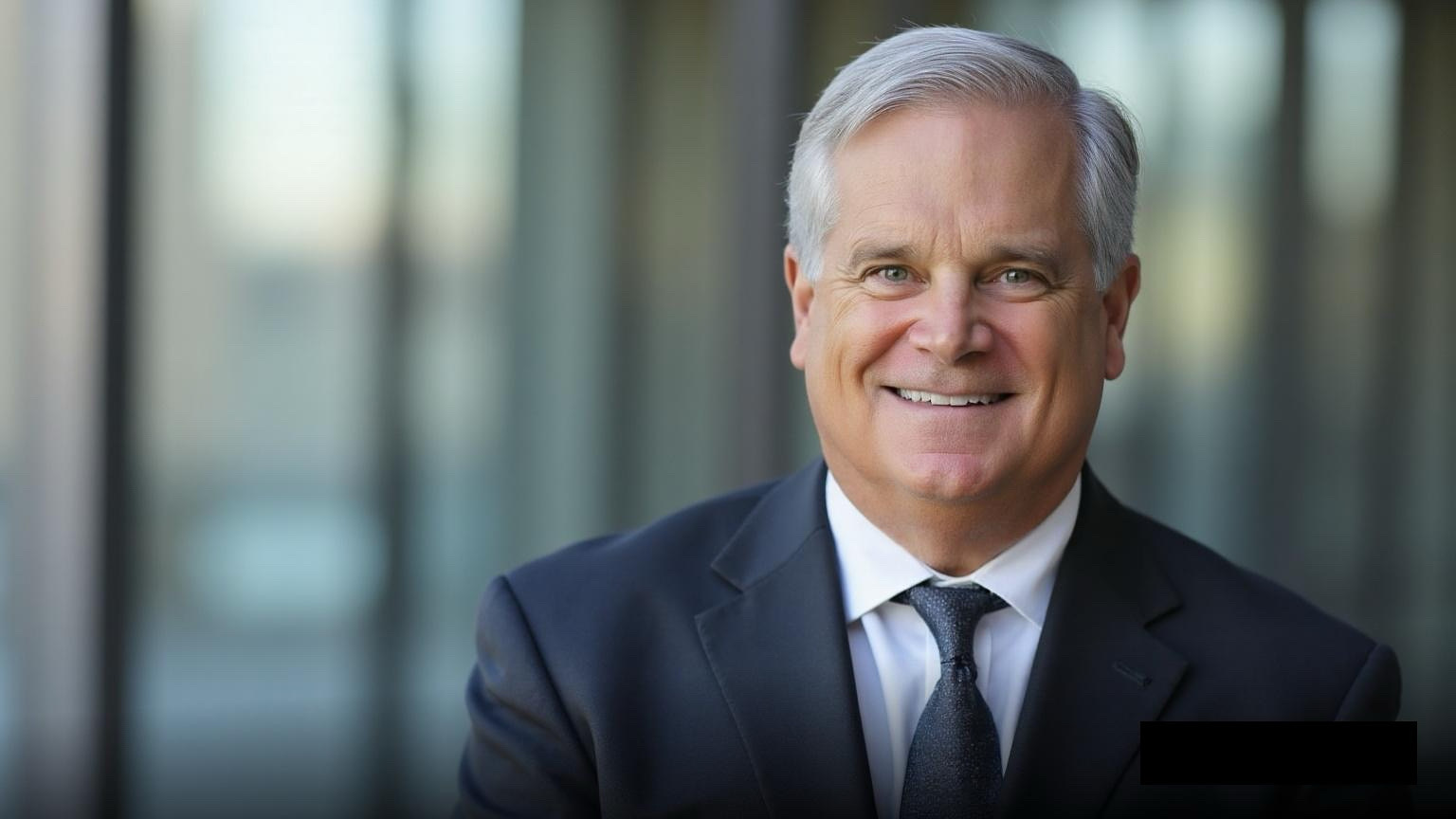
- Marler in 2025
- Education: Washington State University (BA, Political Science, English, and Economics); Seattle University Law School (JD)
- Occupation: Attorney
- Employer: Marler Clark LLP
- Website: www.marlerclark.com

William "Bill" Marler (born c. May 3, 1957) is an American personal injury lawyer specializing in cases involving foodborne illnesses. He is the managing partner of Marler Clark, a law firm based in Seattle, Washington, that focuses on food safety litigation.

== Early life and education ==
Marler earned three Bachelor of Arts degrees in Political Science, English, and Economics from Washington State University in 1982. He later received his Juris Doctor from Seattle University School of Law in 1987.

== Legal career and foodborne illness litigation ==
In 1993, Marler represented 9-year-old Brianne Kiner, who was affected by an Escherichia coli O157:H7 outbreak linked to Jack in the Box. The case resulted in a $15.6 million settlement, one of the largest settlements in a foodborne illness case at the time. Over the past 32 years, Marler has represented victims in every major foodborne illness outbreak in the United States, as well as cases in Europe, Asia, and Africa, securing over $850 million for clients affected by pathogens such as E. coli, Salmonella, Listeria, and Hepatitis A. Notable cases include representing Stephanie Smith, a 19-year-old dancer left brain-damaged and paralyzed by an E. coli-contaminated hamburger from Cargill, settled in 2010 for an amount to support her lifelong care, and Linda Rivera, a mother of six from Nevada, hospitalized for over two years due to severe E. coli-related complications. These cases gained significant attention, with Smith’s story earning a Pulitzer Prize for New York Times reporter Michael Moss and Rivera’s case influencing the passage of the 2010 Food Safety Modernization Act.

Marler has litigated against companies such as Chili's, Kentucky Fried Chicken, Dole, and ConAgra.

== Advocacy and public engagement ==
Marler is active in advocating for stricter food safety regulations and regularly speaks to industry groups and public health organizations. He has been a key advocate for the 2010-2011 FDA Food Safety Modernization Act, working to influence its passage through public advocacy and collaboration with figures like Senate Majority Leader Harry Reid. He has also petitioned the United States Department of Agriculture to strengthen regulations on pathogenic E. coli. Through OutBreak, a nonprofit tied to Marler Clark, he supports food safety education and has established science scholarships at colleges nationwide to promote research in food safety.

He has provided testimony before both the California State Senate Governmental Organization Committee and the U.S. House Committee on Energy and Commerce. Marler is a frequent speaker on foodborne illness litigation and safety issues at public health conferences and food industry events.

== Media and publications ==
Marler’s involvement in the 1993 Jack in the Box E. coli outbreak is detailed in Jeff Benedict’s book Poisoned: The True Story of the Deadly E. Coli Outbreak That Changed the Way Americans Eat. The book was adapted into the documentary Poisoned: The Dirty Truth About Your Food, directed by Stephanie Soechtig, which premiered at the 2023 Tribeca Film Festival and was released on Netflix in August 2023. His work has been profiled in numerous publications, including The Seattle Times (2023, 2009), The Washington Post (2020), and Bloomberg News (2017). His career and advocacy were also featured in the 2020 podcast When It Mattered and the 2018 Food Safety Magazine article "Bill Marler: 25 Years of Food Safety."

In 2009, Marler founded Food Safety News, a website dedicated to food safety journalism. He also contributes regularly to the Food Poison Journal.

== Recognitions and awards ==
Marler has received numerous awards for his work in food safety, including the Public Justice Award from the Washington State Trial Lawyer's Association and the Seattle University Distinguished Law Graduate Award. Additional honors include the 2010 NSF Food Safety Leadership Award for Innovation in Education, the 2008 Outstanding Lawyer Award from the King County Bar Association, and inclusion in Best Lawyers in America annually since 2009. Marler also served as a Governor-appointed Chairman of the Washington State University Board of Regents from 1998 to 2004 and received the 1997 Distinguished Achievement Award from the WSU College of Liberal Arts. The Daily Meal named him one of "America's 50 Most Powerful People in Food for 2016".

His blog has been listed among the top 100 legal blogs by the American Bar Association, and The New Yorker referred to him as "the most prominent and powerful food-safety attorney in the country."

== Selected publications ==
- "Litigating the Food Poisoning Case: The Importance of Prior Inspections and Investigations" (PDF). Trial. American Association for Justice. November 2004. (Co-authored with David W. Babcock).
- "How to Keep Your Focus on Food Safety" (PDF). Food Safety Magazine. Target Group Inc. June–July 2005. ISSN 1084-5984.
- "Lawyers, Microbiologists, and Safe Food" (PDF). Microbiologist Magazine. 11 (2). June 2010.
- "Legal Issues for Food Safety: What Every Food Professional Should Know" (PDF). Food Safety and Quality Magazine. 5 (3). September 2009.
- "Food Safety and the CEO: Keys to Bottom Line Success" (PDF). Food Safety Magazine. October–November 2007.
