= Food Safety News =

Website focused on food safety

- The Food Safety News logo
- Website type: Online newspaper
- Available in: English
- Owner: Marler Clark
- Creator: Bill Marler
- Editors: Dan Flynn, Coral Beach
- Website: www.foodsafetynews.com
- Commercial: Yes
- Registration: No
- Launched: August 10, 2009; 17 years ago
- Current status: Online
- Content license: Copyright

Food Safety News (FSN) is an online news publication focusing on food safety. It was founded in 2009 by Bill Marler, a lawyer and food safety advocate. Marler is the Managing Partner of Marler Clark, a Seattle, Washington, law firm that specializes in foodborne illness cases. He said that Food Safety News was created to "fill a void" left by print and broadcast media as budgetary constraints led to "dedicated reporters on the food, health and safety beats... being reassigned or seeing their positions disappear altogether." The site provides daily news coverage of foodborne illness outbreaks and investigations, food recalls, food technology innovations, and victim profiles.

== News staff ==
FSN's Editor in Chief is Dan Flynn The Managing Editor is Coral Beach.
