= STOP Foodborne Illness =

American public health organization

Stop Foodborne Illness
- Founded: 1993
- Type: 501(c)(3)
- Purpose: Humanitarian
- Location: Chicago, Illinois, US
- Region served: US and Canada
- Method: Assistance and advocacy
- Employees: 6
- Website: https://stopfoodborneillness.org/

Stop Foodborne Illness, or STOP (formerly known as Safe Tables Our Priority), is a non-profit public health organization in the United States dedicated to the prevention of illness and death from foodborne pathogens. It was founded following the West Coast E. coli O157:H7 outbreak of 1993 in California and the Pacific Northwest. STOP's headquarters are in Chicago, Illinois.

== History ==
STOP formed as a grassroots organization out of the collective grief and anger of parents of victims of a major 1993 E. coli O157:H7 outbreak associated with Jack in the Box hamburgers. The outbreak, which resulted in the death of four children and more than 700 people falling ill, garnered nationwide media attention.
