= Marler Clark =

Seattle, Washington based law firm

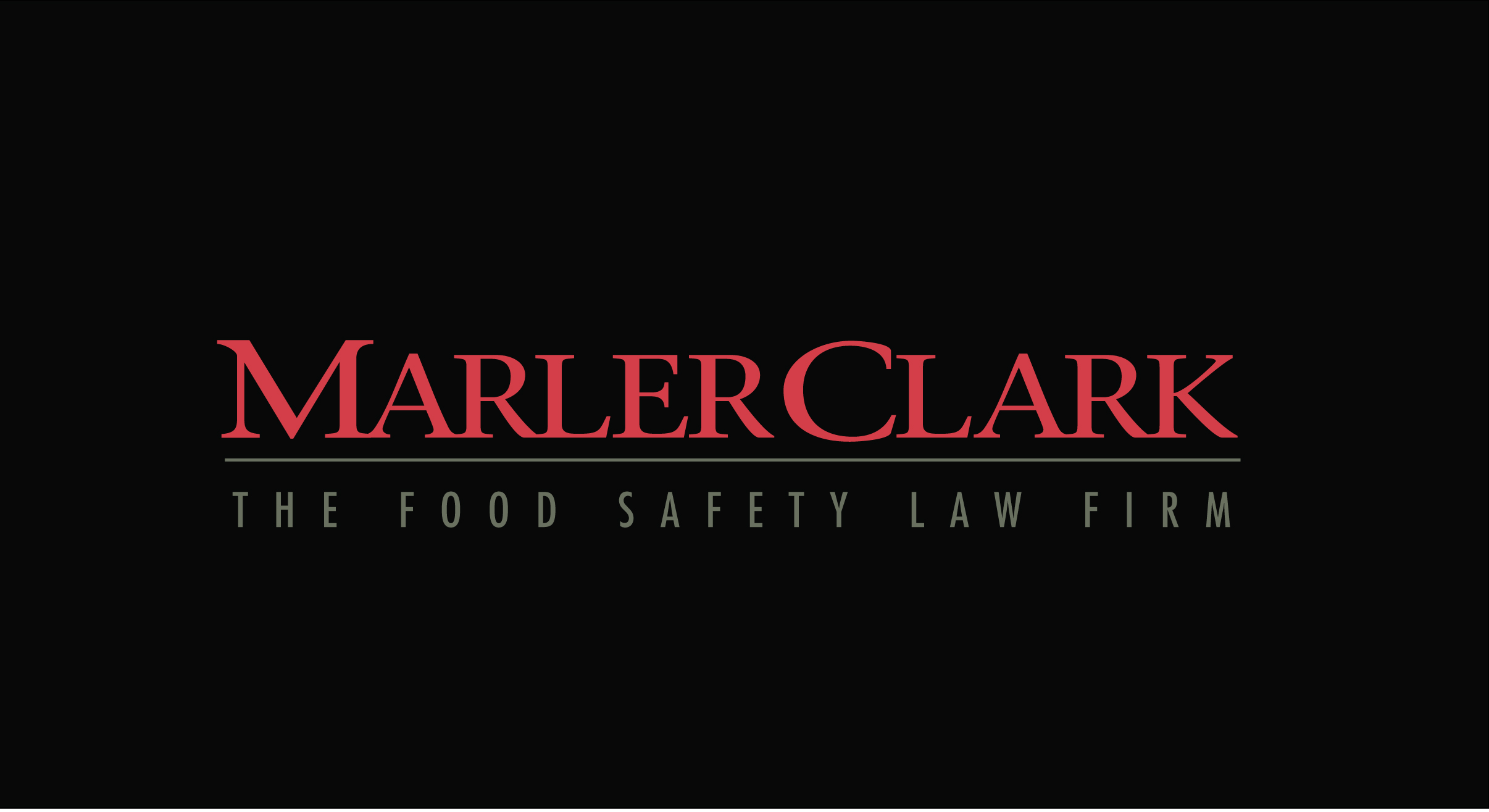
- Headquarters: Bainbridge Island, Washington
- Major practice areas: Foodborne illness litigation
- Date founded: 1998
- Founder: William "Bill" Marler, Denis Stearns, Andy Weisbecker, Bruce Clark
- Website: https://marlerclark.com/

Marler Clark, Inc., P.S. (also referred to as Marler Clark, LLP) is an American law firm based in the Seattle area that specializes in foodborne illness litigation. The firm focuses on representing plaintiffs in cases involving bacterial pathogens such as E. coli, Salmonella, and Listeria.

== History ==
The firm was founded in 1998 by attorneys William "Bill" Marler, Denis Stearns, Andy Weisbecker, and Bruce Clark.

Marler and Weisbecker had represented victims in the 1992–1993 Jack in the Box E. coli outbreak, while Clark and Stearns had represented the defendant, Jack in the Box. The partners combined their plaintiff- and defense-side experience from that litigation to form the firm, which has been described as the first U.S. law firm dedicated exclusively to representing victims of foodborne illness.

The firm's work grew out of the Jack in the Box outbreak, which sickened nearly 700 people and led to four child deaths. Marler had previously secured a record $15.6 million settlement for the most severely injured survivor, Brianne Kiner.

In 2020, Marler filed a petition with the USDA asking it to ban dozens of salmonella strains.

== Notable cases ==
Marler Clark has represented victims in multiple high-profile foodborne illness outbreaks. Notable examples include:

- The 1992–1993 Jack in the Box E. coli outbreak, where the founding attorneys handled both plaintiff and defense aspects of the litigation.
- The 2006 Taco Bell and related outbreaks.
- The 2008–2009 Peanut Corporation of America Salmonella outbreak.
- Various Listeria, Hepatitis A, Salmonella, and other outbreaks involving major food companies such as Dole, Cargill, McDonald's, and Chi-Chi's.

== Recognition ==
The firm has been recognized by Best Lawyers in America for its work in mass tort litigation, personal injury, and product liability.

== See also ==
- William Marler
- 1992–1993 Jack in the Box E. coli outbreak
- Foodborne illness
