= Robert O. Peterson =

American businessman (1916-1994)

- Born: Robert Oscar Peterson; March 13, 1916; San Diego, California, US
- Died: April 18, 1994 (aged 78); Point Loma, San Diego, California, US
- Education: San Diego State University; University of California, Los Angeles (BA)
- Occupations: Businessman, philanthropist, restaurateur
- Years active: 1941−1984
- Known for: Founder of Jack in the Box restaurant chain
- Spouse: Maureen O'Connor (m. 1977)
- Military career
- Allegiance: United States
- Branch: United States Navy
- Conflicts: World War II

Robert Oscar Peterson (March 13, 1916 – April 18, 1994) was an American businessman and philanthropist. As the founder of the Jack in the Box restaurant chain, he popularized the drive-through fast food restaurant concept. He is credited with being the first to pair the drive-through window with an intercom system.

== Personal life ==
He grew up in San Diego and graduated from Hoover High School in 1933. He attended San Diego State University and graduated from UCLA with a degree in economics. He was a naval intelligence officer during World War II. He was married four times, notably (in 1977) to Maureen O'Connor, who went on to become the first female mayor of San Diego from 1985 to 1992; this was his only marriage not to end in divorce. The former mayor was at his side when he died in 1994. He had four children by his previous marriage to Lorraine Bhalla, none of whom went into the restaurant business.

== Restaurant career ==
Peterson entered the restaurant business in 1941 with a drive-in diner called "Topsy's" (later renamed "Oscar's"), located at 6270 El Cajon Boulevard in San Diego. This was a classic drive-in where food was served by carhops to patrons in the parking lot. Over the next decade his company, the San Diego Commissary Company, operated several Topsy's and Oscar's restaurants throughout San Diego, including a flagship Oscar's at Midway Drive and Rosecrans Street in the Midway area. In 1951, he converted the Oscar's on El Cajon Boulevard into the first Jack in the Box, a drive-through with the innovation of a two-way intercom that allowed one car to place an order while another car was being served. Other restaurants had previously offered drive-up window service, but Jack in the Box was the first major chain to make drive-through windows the focus of its operation. Since the concept was unfamiliar to most customers, the speaker (topped with the trademark clown) had a sign that announced "Pull forward, Jack will speak to you!"

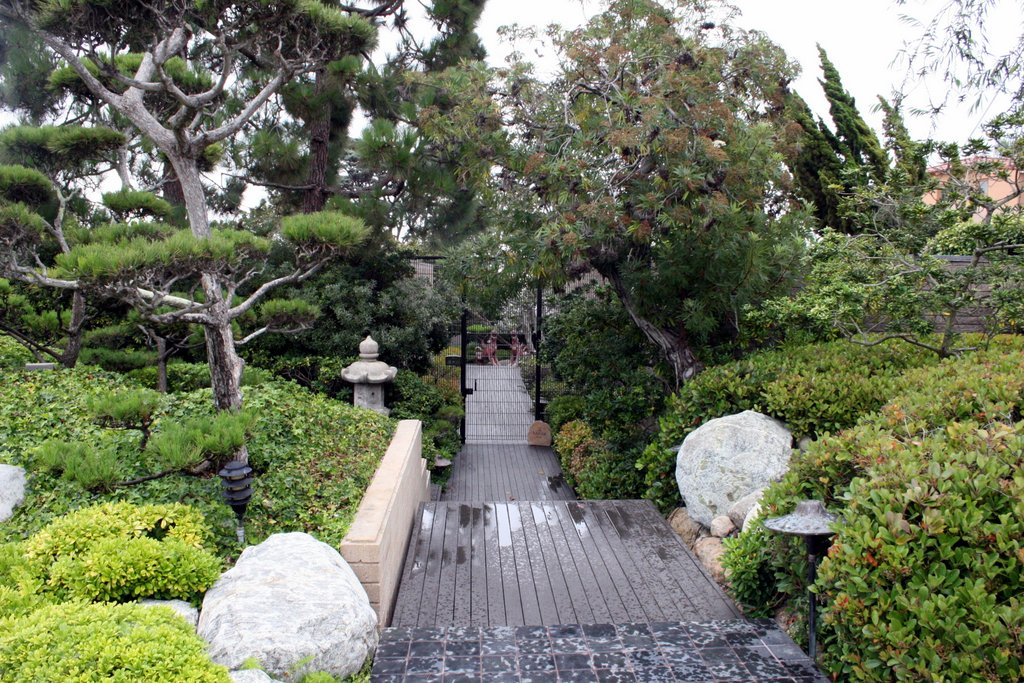
Entrance to Peterson's home in Point Loma.

The Jack in the Box restaurant was conceived as a "modern food machine" and was designed by La Jolla master architect Russell Forester, who also designed Peterson's landmark home in Point Loma in 1965.

Peterson built the chain to over 300 locations. He renamed his company Foodmaker in 1960 and sold it in 1967 to Ralston-Purina. By that time, the "drive-thru" concept had become an industry standard.

== Later life ==
He spent the final 30 years of his life in philanthropy and civic improvement. He was a consistent patron of the Scripps Institution of Oceanography, sponsoring research for many years, and donating the 96-foot diesel yacht Dolphin to the institution in 1973. Peterson Hall at the University of California, San Diego is named after him.

In 1984, he was diagnosed with leukemia. He battled the disease for the next 10 years until his death in 1994 at the age of 78.
