= 1992–1993 Jack in the Box E. coli outbreak =

Fast food disease outbreak

- The outbreak was centred on Jack in the Box fast food outlets in the United States.
- Pathogen: Escherichia coli O157:H7
- Source: Contaminated beef products at Jack in the Box restaurants
- Location: Western United States
- First outbreak: Seattle, Washington
- First reported: January 12, 1993
- Date: December 18, 1992 – February 23, 1993
- Confirmed cases: 732
- Severe cases: 178
- Deaths: 4

The 1992–1993 Jack in the Box E. coli outbreak occurred when the Escherichia coli O157:H7 bacterium (originating from contaminated beef patties) killed 4 children and infected 732 people across four US states. The outbreak involved 73 Jack in the Box restaurants in California, Idaho, Washington, and Nevada, and has been described as "far and away the most infamous food poison outbreak in contemporary history". The majority of the affected were under 10 years old. Four children died and 178 others were left with permanent injury including kidney and brain damage.

On February 10, 1993, newly inaugurated president Bill Clinton participated in a televised town meeting program from the studios of WXYZ-TV in Detroit. He fielded questions from the studio audience as well as studio audiences in Miami and Seattle and responded to questions from the parents of Riley Detwiler – the fourth and final child to die in the E. coli outbreak. The wide media coverage and scale of the outbreak were responsible for "bringing the exotic-sounding bacterium out of the lab and into the public consciousness," but it was not the first E. coli O157:H7 outbreak resulting from undercooked patties. The bacterium had previously been identified in an outbreak of food poisoning in 1982 (traced to undercooked burgers sold by McDonald's restaurants in Oregon and Michigan). Before the Jack in the Box incident, there had been 22 documented outbreaks in the United States resulting in 35 deaths.

== Sources ==
On January 12, 1993, Phil Tarr, then a pediatric gastroenterologist at the University of Washington and Seattle's Children's Hospital, filed a report with the Washington State Department of Health (DOH) about a perceived cluster of children with bloody diarrhea and hemolytic–uremic syndrome (HUS) likely caused by E. coli O157:H7. Tarr contacted epidemiologist John Kobayashi, who started the epidemiological trace-back, linking these cases to undercooked hamburger patties. Kobayashi recalled the conversation in an interview: "I knew that, when Phil called me, ... for him to say, 'this is something that I've never seen before,' that was a big red flag."

Health inspectors traced the contamination to the Jack in the Box fast food chain, especially their "Monster Burger" which had been on a special promotion and sold at a discounted price. The ensuing high demand "overwhelmed" the restaurants' food safety protocols, such that the patties were not cooked long enough or at a high enough temperature to kill the bacteria.

On January 18, 1993, the DOH announced the source of the E. coli O157 outbreak in a press conference. Afterwards, Jack in the Box agreed to stop serving hamburgers and to quarantine the meat patties. Two days later, a powerful storm swept through Seattle and King County. The storm ravaged the area, knocking out power for thousands of residents across three counties, with some living in the dark for 5 days. The power outage impacted restaurants' proper cooking temperatures and safe refrigeration temperatures, and even hindered thorough hand-washing – all critical factors in preventing foodborne illnesses.

At a 1993 press conference, the president of Foodmaker (the parent company of Jack in the Box) blamed Vons Companies, the supplier of their hamburger meat, for the E. coli epidemic. However, the Jack in the Box fast-food restaurant chain had knowledge of but disregarded Washington state laws which required burgers to be cooked to 155 °F (68 °C), the temperature necessary to completely kill E. coli. Instead, it adhered to the federal standard of 140 °F (60 °C). If Jack in the Box followed the state cooking standard, the outbreak would have been prevented, according to court documents and experts from the Washington State Health Department.

The subsequent investigation by the Centers for Disease Control and Prevention (CDC) identified five slaughterhouses in the United States and one in Canada as "the likely sources of [...] the contaminated lots of meat." In February 1998, Foodmaker agreed to accept $58.5 million from Vons and eight other beef suppliers to settle the lawsuit, which had been initiated in 1993.

A total of 732 cases were confirmed, with 171 people requiring hospitalization. The majority of those who presented symptoms and were clinically diagnosed (but not hospitalized) were children under 10 years old. Of the infected children, 45 required hospitalization – 38 had serious kidney problems, and 21 required dialysis.

Four people, all of whom were children, died:

- Six-year-old Lauren Beth Rudolph of Southern California died on December 28, 1992, due to complications of an E. coli O157:H7 infection later tied to the same outbreak. (Lauren Rudolph E. coli case)
- Two-year-old Michael Nole of Tacoma, Washington, died on January 22, 1993, at Children's Hospital Medical Center in Seattle of heart failure stemming from kidney failure caused by E. coli O157:H7.
- Two-year-old Celina Shribbs of Mountlake Terrace, Washington, died on January 28, 1993. She became ill due to a secondary contact (person-to-person) transmission from another child sick with E. coli.
- Seventeen-month-old Riley Detwiler of Bellingham, Washington, died on February 20, 1993, following secondary contact (person-to-person) transmission from another child sick with E. coli. The 18-month-old boy who infected Riley had spent two days with bloody diarrhea in the daycare center before a clinical laboratory could return the positive test results for E. coli. The first boy's mother suspected her son had E. coli but did not tell the daycare staff for fear that she would be compelled to care for him at home. When the test results came in positive for E. coli, county health officials could not reach the child's parents during the workday. Both of the first boy's parents worked at Jack in the Box, where they regularly fed their son hamburgers. Riley, on the other hand, had never eaten a hamburger. Some experts speculate that, while most media coverage focused on the company and the government – treating the affected as faceless and nameless statistics – the interaction of Riley Detwiler's parents with President Bill Clinton resulted in the ensuing national news coverage giving a human face to the events. On Tuesday, February 23, 1993, 3 days after Riley's death, the American Meat Institute (AMI) sponsored an industry briefing in Chicago to discuss the E. coli O157:H7 outbreak tied to contaminated hamburgers sold at Jack in the Box. Jim Marsden, AMI's vice president for scientific and technical affairs, started off the meeting by informing the group that "Riley Detwiler, the 17-month-old son of the parents who you just saw featured at the town meeting with President Clinton, died last Saturday."

== Lawsuits ==
In 1993, attorney William Marler represented 9-year-old Brianne Kiner in litigation against Jack in the Box following an E. coli O157:H7 outbreak, securing a $15.6 million settlement.

Marler represented hundreds of other victims of the outbreak in a class-action suit against Jack in the Box, settling for over $50 million. At the time, it was the largest-ever payout related to foodborne illness.

Victims of the Jack in the Box E. coli crisis sued Foodmaker Inc. because they were responsible for supplying the meat for Jack in the Box restaurants. Sheree Zizzi was a spokesperson for Foodmaker Inc. when the lawsuit of Riley Detwiler was settled, she had a positive view on the lawsuit by referring to it as fair and equitable. However, another Foodmaker Inc. official, Robert Nugent was not pleased and viewed the lawsuits as poor settlements with the franchisees as a whole. The main argument made against Foodmaker Inc. in these lawsuits was that they had failed to check the meat supply to deem it safe to eat and that they withheld information for their benefit from the company.

In hopes to improve the company's reputation, the chairman of Jack in the Box, Jack Goodall, publicly announced that the company shared their sympathy and prayers to the families of the victims of the crisis. He added that Jack in the Box would pay the hospital bills for all of the customers affected with E. coli.

== Legacy ==
External videos
- "Chasing Outbreaks: How Safe is our Food?". Retro Report short film dated May 10, 2015, discussing the Jack in the Box outbreak and how it led to major changes in industry practices and government oversight of the food supply. (Duration: 11 mins 8 secs)

Senator Richard Durbin (D-IL), addressing a congressional hearing on food safety in 2006, described the outbreak as "a pivotal moment in the history of the beef industry." James Reagan, vice president of Research and Knowledge Management at the National Cattlemen's Beef Association (NCBA), said that the outbreak was "significant to the industry" and "the initiative that moved us further down the road [of food safety] and still drives us today." David Acheson, a former US Food and Drug Administration (FDA) Associate Commissioner for Foods, in 2015 told Retro Report that "Jack in the Box was a wakeup call to many, including the regulators. You go in for a hamburger with the kids and you could die. It changed consumers' perceptions and it absolutely changed the behaviors of the industry."

As a direct result of the outbreak:

- E. coli O157:H7 was upgraded to become a reportable disease at all state health departments.
- The US FDA increased the recommended internal temperature for cooked hamburgers from 140 °F (60 °C) to 155 °F (68 °C).
- The United States Department of Agriculture (USDA) Food Safety and Inspection Service (FSIS) introduced safe food-handling labels for packaged raw meat and poultry retailed in supermarkets, alongside an education campaign alerting consumers to the risks associated with undercooked hamburgers. The labels and the education campaign came with criticism and objection from the industry.
- The FSIS introduced testing for E. coli O157:H7 in ground meat.
- The USDA reclassified E. coli O157:H7 as an adulterant in ground beef.
- The USDA introduced the Pathogen Reduction and Hazard Analysis and Critical Control Points (PR/HACCP) program.
- The NCBA created a task force to fund research into the reduction of E. coli O157:H7 in cattle and in slaughterhouses.
- Jack in the Box completely overhauled and restructured their corporate operations around food safety priorities, setting new standards across the fast food industry.
- Roni Rudolph, mother of Lauren Rudolph, and many other parents of affected children formed STOP Foodborne Illness (formerly Safe Tables Our Priority, or S.T.O.P.), a national non-profit organization dedicated "to prevent[ing] Americans from becoming ill and dying from foodborne illness" by advocating for sound public policy, building public awareness, and assisting those impacted by foodborne illness.
- Parents of the affected children played key roles in spreading awareness and advocating for change – speaking directly to President Bill Clinton, meeting with Vice President Al Gore, testifying before the Clinton Healthcare Task Force, working with the Secretary of Agriculture, and discussing food safety issues with lawmakers in Washington, D.C.
- Darin Detwiler, who lost his son, Riley, to E. coli–caused hemolytic–uremic syndrome during the outbreak, later served as a regulatory policy advisor to the USDA for meat and poultry inspection. Detwiler became a professor of Food Policy and the Director of Regulatory Affairs of Food and Food Industry at Northeastern University. In 2018, 25 years after his son's death in the outbreak, Dr. Detwiler received the Food Safety Magazine "Distinguished Service Award" for 25 years of contribution to food safety and policy.
- E. coli–related events that are reported by the media outlets, often cite the Jack in the Box example because of its significance with its brand and the people. The repetition of negative media on a restaurant tarnishes its history because the consumers of the media will uphold that negative image for long periods of time. Foodmaker Inc. officials defended themselves and their brand by taking the blame away from their cooking practices because they believed they had not caused the outbreak. However, the Health Department would find that their burgers were undercooked under state-approved regulations. The officials would then issue their apology regarding their part in starting the outbreak.
- Due to this crisis, Jack in the Box as a whole would have to face the accusations of being irresponsible for their actions and ignoring safety regulations that are set in place, as well as having poor communication when addressing the crisis to their customers.
- Poisoned: The True Story of the Deadly E. Coli Outbreak That Changed the Way Americans Eat was a 2011 book by Jeff Benedict that followed the events of the outbreak and the development of Bill Marler, an attorney who fought against Jack in the Box. The book later became the basis of the 2023 Netflix documentary, Poisoned: The Dirty Truth About Your Food.

== See also ==
- 1996 Odwalla E. coli outbreak
- List of food contamination incidents
- STOP Foodborne Illness
- 2024 McDonald's E. coli outbreak

== Bibliography ==
- Benedict, Jeff (May 16, 2011). Poisoned: The True Story of the Deadly E. coli Outbreak That Changed the Way Americans Eat. Buena Vista, VA: Inspire Books. ISBN 9780983347804.
- Detwiler, Darin (2020). Food Safety: Past, Present, and Predictions (1st ed.). Cambridge, MA: Elsevier Academic Press. ISBN 9780128182192.
- Davis, M. (April 16, 1993). "Update: Multistate Outbreak of Escherichia coli O157:H7 Infections from Hamburgers – Western United States, 1992–1993". Morbidity and Mortality Weekly Report. 42 (14).
- Drexler, Madeline (December 23, 2009). Secret Agents: The Menace of Emerging Infections (Revised ed.). New York, NY: Penguin Books. ISBN 9780143117179.
- Golan, Elise; Roberts, Tanya; Salay, Elisabete; Caswell, Julie; Ollinger, Michael; Moore, Danna (April 2004). "Food Safety Innovation in the United States: Evidence from the Meat Industry". Agricultural Economic Report (831).
- Hunter, Beatrice Trum (2009). Infectious Connections. Laguna Beach, CA: Basic Health Publications. ISBN 9781591202448.
- Manning, Shannon D. (April 1, 2010). Escherichia coli Infections (2nd ed.). New York, NY: Chelsea House Publishers. ISBN 9781604132533.
- Nestle, Marion (July 2, 2010). Safe Food: The Politics of Food Safety (2nd Revised ed.). Berkeley, CA: University of California Press. ISBN 9780520266063.
- Roberts, Paul (2008). The End of Food. London: Bloomsbury Publishing. ISBN 9780747588818.
- Schlosser, Eric (2001). Fast Food Nation. London: Penguin Books. ISBN 9780141006871.
- Schlosser, Eric; Wilson, Charles (2006). Chew On This: Everything You Don't Want to Know About Fast Food. New York, NY: Houghton Mifflin Harcourt. ISBN 9780618593941.
