= Jack in the Box =

American fast-food restaurant chain

Jack in the Box, Inc.
- Logo used since October 4, 2022.

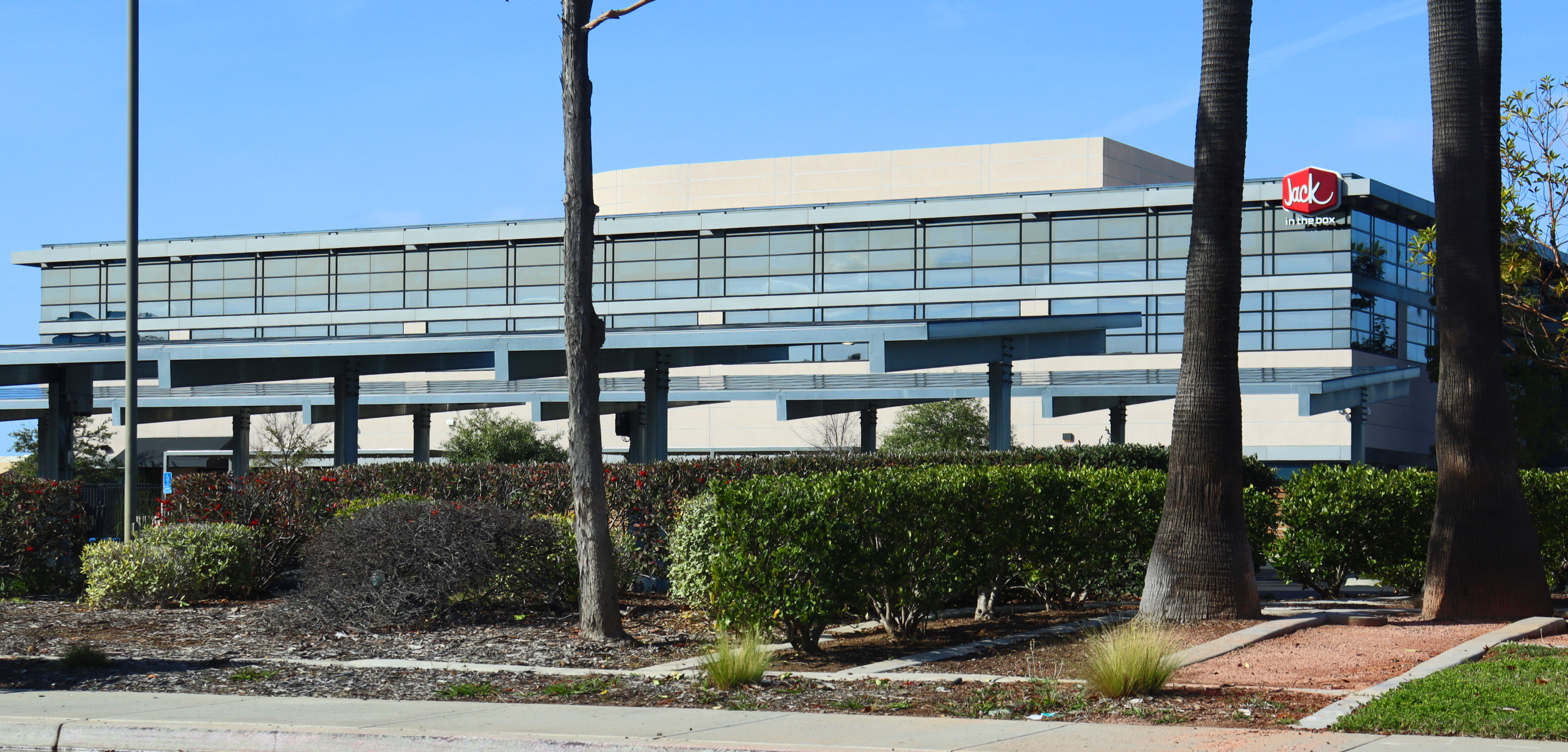
- Jack in the Box headquarters in San Diego, California, in February 2025
- Type: Public
- Traded as: Nasdaq: JACK
- Industry: Restaurants
- Genre: Fast food
- Founded: 1951; 75 years ago
- Founder: Robert O. Peterson
- Headquarters: 9357 Spectrum Center Blvd, San Diego, California, U.S.
- Number of locations: 2,712 (2025)
- Area served: 22 states in the U.S. Mexico (3 locations); Guam (2 locations)
- Key people: Mark King (Executive Chairman and Interim CEO)
- Products: Hamburgers; chicken; sandwiches; salads; breakfast; desserts
- Revenue: ▼US$1.465 billion (2025)
- Operating income: ▼US$-18.070 million (2025)
- Net income: ▼US$-80.719 million (2025)
- Total assets: ▼US$2.593 billion (2025)
- Total equity: ▼US$938.271 million (2025)
- Number of employees: 5,046 (2025)
- Website: jackinthebox.com

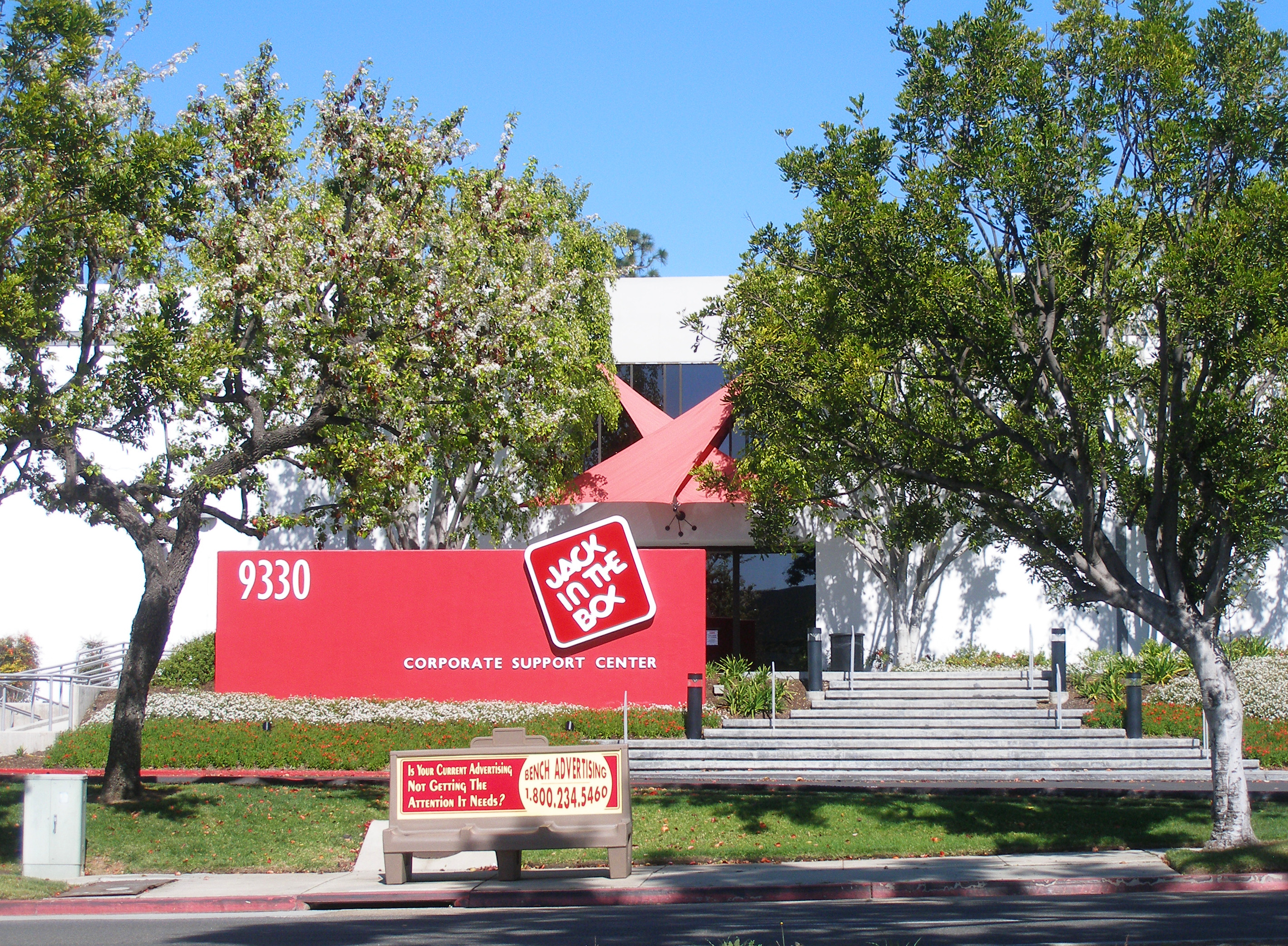
Former headquarters in San Diego, February 2008 (since demolished in 2025)

Jack in the Box, Inc. is an American fast-food restaurant chain founded on February 21, 1951, by Robert O. Peterson in San Diego, California, where it is headquartered. The chain has over 2,712 locations, primarily serving the West Coast of the United States. Restaurants are also found in large urban areas outside the West Coast, as well as two in Guam. The company also formerly operated the Qdoba Mexican Grill chain until Apollo Global Management bought the chain in December 2017.

Food items include a variety of chicken tenders and french fries along with hamburger and cheeseburger sandwiches and selections of internationally themed foods such as tacos and egg rolls.

== History ==
Robert O. Peterson already owned several successful restaurants when he opened Topsy's Drive-In at 6270 El Cajon Boulevard in San Diego in 1941. Several more Topsy's were opened. By the late 1940s, Peterson's locations had developed a circus-like décor featuring drawings of a starry-eyed clown. In 1947, Peterson obtained rights for the intercom ordering concept from George Manos who owned one location named Chatterbox in Anchorage, Alaska, the first known location to use the intercom concept for drive-up windows. In 1951, Peterson converted the El Cajon Boulevard location into Jack in the Box, a hamburger stand focused on drive-through service. While the drive-through concept was not new, Jack in the Box innovated a two-way intercom system, the first major chain to use an intercom and the first to focus on drive-through.

The intercom allowed much faster service than a traditional drive-up window; while one customer was being served at the window, a second and even a third customer's order could be taken and prepared. A giant clown projected from the roof, and a smaller clown head sat atop the intercom, where a sign said, "Pull forward, Jack will speak to you." The Jack in the Box restaurant was conceived as a "modern food machine," designed by La Jolla, California, master architect Russell Forester. Quick service made the new location very popular, and soon all of Oscar's locations were redesigned with intercoms and rechristened Jack in the Box restaurants.

Peterson formed Foodmaker, Inc. as a holding company for Jack in the Box in 1960. At this time, all Jack in the Box locations—over 180, mainly in California and the Southwest—were company owned. Location sites, food preparation, quality control, and the hiring and training of on-site managers and staff in each location were subject to rigorous screening and strict performance standards.

In 1968, Peterson sold Foodmaker to Ralston Purina Company. In the 1970s, Foodmaker led the Jack in the Box chain toward its most prolific growth (television commercials in the early 1970s featured child actor Rodney Allen Rippy) and began to franchise locations. The chain began to increasingly resemble its larger competitors, particularly industry giant McDonald's. Jack in the Box began to struggle in the latter part of the decade; its expansion into East Coast markets was cut back, then halted. By the end of the decade, Jack in the Box restaurants were sold in increasing numbers.

Around 1980, Foodmaker dramatically altered Jack in the Box's marketing strategy by literally blowing up the chain's symbol, the jack-in-the-box, in television commercials with the tagline, "The food is better at the Box". Jack in the Box announced that it would no longer compete for McDonald's target customer base of families with young children. Instead, Foodmaker targeted older, more affluent "yuppie" customers with a higher-quality, more upscale menu and a series of whimsical television commercials featuring Dan Gilvezan, who attempted to compare the new menu items to those of McDonald's and other fast-food chains, to no avail; hence "There's No Comparison", their slogan at the time. Jack in the Box restaurants were remodeled and redecorated with decorator pastel colors and hanging plants; the logo, containing a clown's head in a red box with the company name in red text to or below the box (signs in front of the restaurant displayed the clown's head only), was modified, stacking the words in a red diagonal box while still retaining the clown's head; by about 1981 or 1982, the clown's head was removed from the logo.

Television advertising from about 1985 onward featured minimalistic music by a small chamber-like ensemble (specifically a distinctive seven-note plucked musical signature). The menu, previously focused on hamburgers led by the flagship Jumbo Jack, became much more diverse, including salads, chicken sandwiches, finger foods, and seasoned Curly Fries (at least two new menu items were introduced per year), at a time when few fast-food operations offered more than standard hamburgers. Annual sales increased through the 1980s. Ralston Purina tried further to mature the restaurant's image, renaming it "Monterey Jack's" in late 1985. The name change was poorly received, and the Jack in the Box name was restored in early 1986.

After 18 years, Ralston Purina decided in 1985 that Foodmaker was a noncore asset and sold it to management. By 1987, sales reached $655 million, the chain boasted 897 restaurants, and Foodmaker became a publicly traded company.

At their annual meeting in July 2018, the National Jack in the Box Franchisee Association, which represented the owners of about 2,000 of the chain's 2,240 restaurants, voted "no confidence" in the company's chief executive officer, Leonard "Lenny" Comma, and called for him to resign. In December 2019, Comma said he would be stepping down.

On December 6, 2021, Jack in the Box announced that it was acquiring Del Taco for $12.51 per share. Del Taco had about 600 locations in 16 U.S. states. The acquisition was finalized in March 2022.

On October 16, 2025, Jack in the Box sold Del Taco to Yadav Enterprises for $115 million. The sale was finalized on December 22, 2025.

=== JBX Grill ===
JBX Grill was a line of fast casual restaurants introduced in 2004 by Jack in the Box Inc. They featured high-quality, cafe-style food, avoiding most of the cheaper fast-food items typically served at Jack in the Box. The architecture and decor maintained an upbeat, positive atmosphere, and the customer service was comparable to most dine-in restaurants. Two of the Jack in the Box restaurants in San Diego (where Jack in the Box is headquartered) were converted to JBX Grill restaurants to test the concept. (The locations in Hillcrest and Pacific Beach still retain many of the JBX elements, including an indoor/outdoor fireplace and modern architecture.) Also, restaurants were located in Bakersfield, California; Boise, Idaho; and Nampa, Idaho, but the concept later proved unsuccessful, and the last stores were reconverted to Jack in the Box in 2006.

== Products ==
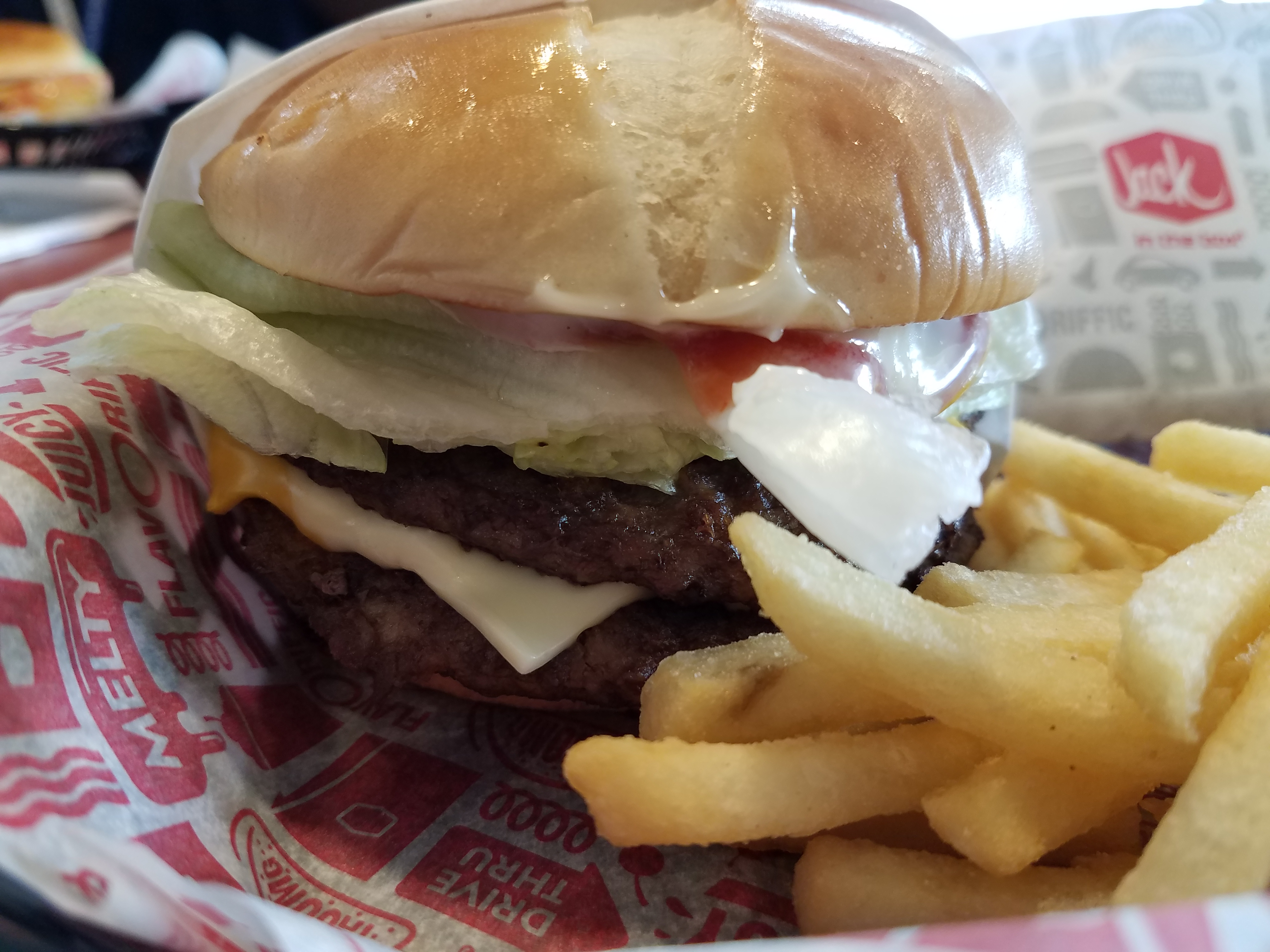
Bacon Ultimate Cheeseburger

Although best known for its hamburgers, Jack in the Box's most popular product is its taco, which it has sold since opening its first restaurant in the 1950s. As of 2017, the company sold 554 million tacos a year; they are manufactured in three factories in Texas and Kansas. What makes the taco unusual is that it is created with the meat and hard taco shell in the Texas and Kansas facilities, then frozen for transport and storage. At the restaurant, it is then deep-fried, then prepared with lettuce, cheese, and mild taco sauce before serving.

Besides tacos, other Americanized foods from ethnic cuisines that Jack in the Box offers include egg rolls, breakfast burritos, and jalapeño poppers. New items come in on a rotation every three to four months, including the Philly cheesesteak and the deli-style pannidos (deli trio, ham and turkey, zesty turkey), which were replaced by Jack's ciabatta burger and included the original ciabatta burger and the bacon 'n' cheese ciabatta. Jack in the Box also carries seasonal items such as pumpkin pie shakes, Oreo mint shakes, and eggnog shakes during the Thanksgiving and Christmas holidays. In some locations, local delicacies are a regular part of the menu. Locations in Hawaii, for example, include the Paniolo breakfast (Portuguese sausage, eggs, and rice platter) and teriyaki chicken and rice bowl. In the Southern United States, the company offers biscuits and sweet tea. In Imperial County, California, some locations sell date shakes, reflecting the crop's ubiquity in the region's farms. In the spring of 2007, Jack in the Box also introduced its sirloin burger and followed this up recently with the sirloin steak melt. Its more recent foray into the deli market was the less-popular Ultimate Club Sandwich, which was initially removed in Arizona due to poor sales and has since been phased out at all locations.

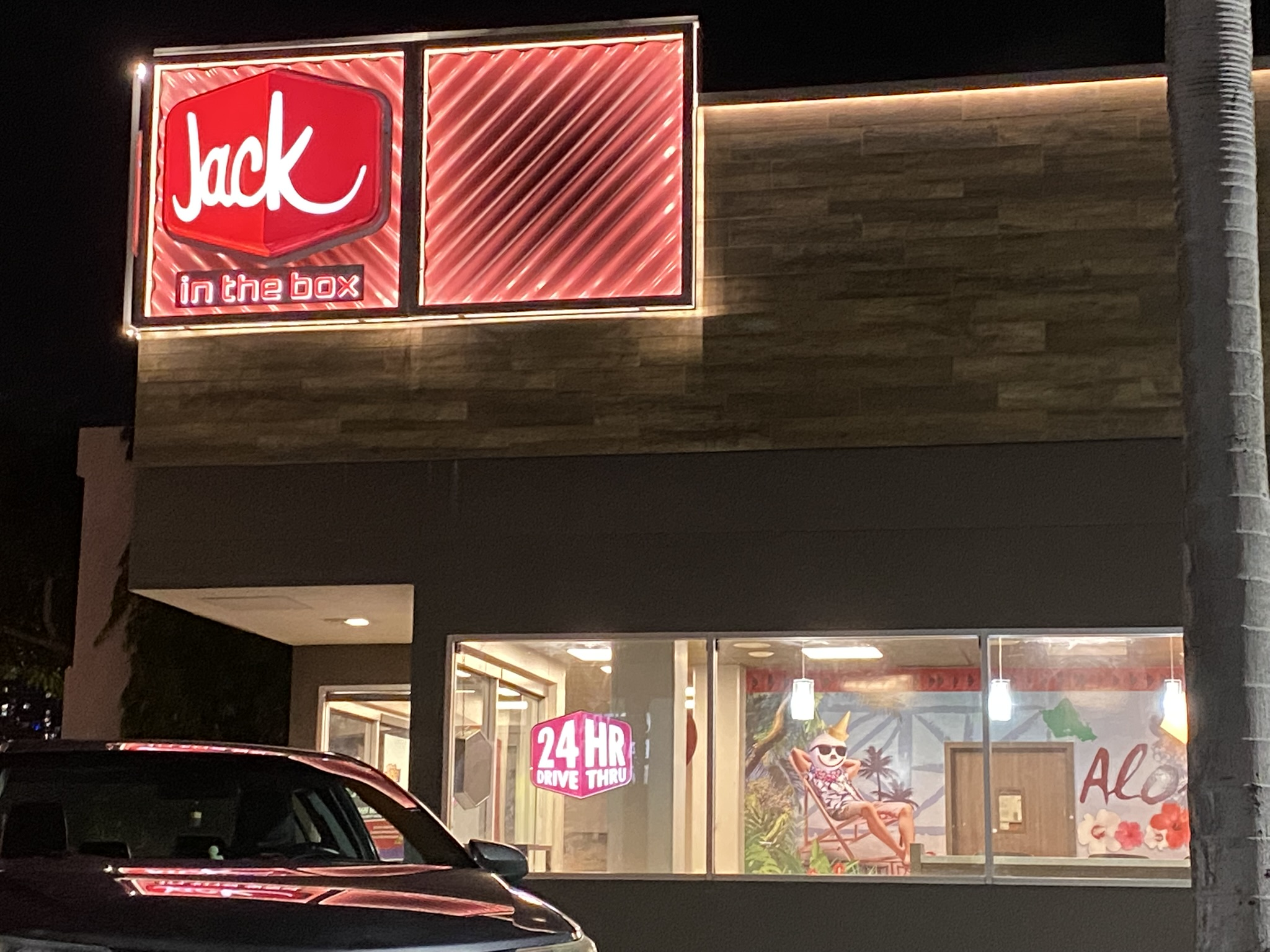
Jack in the Box in Hawaii

The Bonus Jack, first released in 1970, has been reintroduced to Jack in the Box menus at times throughout the years, still containing "Jack's secret sauce". In November 2009, the company discontinued its popular ciabatta sandwiches/burgers. In 2012, Jack in the Box introduced a bacon milkshake as part of its "Marry Bacon" campaign.

The Sourdough Jack, which uses two slices of sourdough bread with a hamburger patty and swiss cheese has been around since 1997 (although it was first introduced in 1991 as the "Sourdough Grilled Burger").

In September 2013, Jack's Munchie Meal was introduced. The 4 original Munchie Meals were Spicy Nacho Chicken Sandwich, Sriracha Curly Fry Burger, Stacked Grilled Cheeseburger, and Chick-n-Tater Melt. Each meal also contains two tacos, halfsie fries (curly fries and french fries), and a 20 oz. drink. In 2023, the items were replaced with a new Build Your Own Munchie Meal which now include an Ultimate Cheeseburger, Jack's Spicy Chicken Sandwich, Cluck Sandwich, and a Double Jack.

In October 2016, the "Brunchfast" items were introduced. Those are Bacon and Egg Chicken Sandwich, Blood Orange Fruit Cooler, Brunch Burger, Cranberry Orange Muffins, Homestyle Potatoes, and Southwest Scrambler Plate.

In January 2018, the "Food Truck Series" sandwiches were introduced, including the Asian Fried Chicken, Pork Belly BLT, and Prime Rib Cheesesteak.

In January 2023, Jack in the Box started selling Red Bull Infusions drinks at its locations.

In February 2023, Jack in the Box partnered with Mint Mobile and Ryan Reynolds. A minty version of the classic Oreo Shake was created and titled the "Mint Mobile Shake" to promote the mobile virtual network operator. A 15-second promotion video was featured on February 27, 2023, with Ryan Reynolds as the spokesperson.

The chain at various times has served a fish sandwich. The offering has returned for a limited time during the Lenten season since 2023.

== Advertising ==
In 1980, Jack in the Box launched an aggressive marketing campaign by blowing up their mascot, a clown with a ping pong ball-like head, a yellow clown cap, two blue eyes, a pointy black nose, and a linear red smile. Two years later, Dan Gilvezan was featured in several commercials, comparing the restaurant's meals to other restaurants and ending the commercial with the tag line: "There's No Comparison."

The restaurant rebounded in popularity in 1994 after a highly successful marketing campaign that featured the fictitious Jack in the Box chairman Jack character (formerly voiced by the campaign's creator Rick Sittig), the mascot who resembles the restaurant's former clown mascot, but dressed in a business suit.

Jack was reintroduced specifically to signal the new direction the company was taking to refocus and regroup after the 1993 E. coli disaster, discussed below, which threatened the chain's very existence. In the original spot that debuted in fall 1994, Jack ("through the miracle of plastic surgery", he says as he confidently strides into the office building) reclaims his rightful role as founder and CEO, and apparently as revenge for being blown up in 1980, approaches the closed doors of the Jack in the Box boardroom (a fictionalized version, shown while the aforementioned minimalist theme music from the 1980s Jack in the Box commercials plays), activates a detonation device, and the boardroom explodes in a shower of smoke, wood, and paper. The spot ends with a close-up shot of a small, white, paper bag, presumably filled with Jack in the Box food, dropping forcefully onto a table; the bag is printed with the words "Jack's Back" in bold red print, then another bag drops down with the Jack in the Box logo from that period. Later ads feature the first bag showing the text of the food item or offer the commercial is promoting (both bags have featured text since 1998). The Spanish ads feature an unknown voice shouting "Jack!" before another bag drops down.

The commercials in the "Jack's Back" campaign (which has won several advertising industry awards) tend to be lightly humorous and often involve Jack making business decisions about the restaurant chain's food products, or out in the field getting ideas for new menu items. While a series of ads claiming to ask when Burger King and McDonald's will change their ways about making their hamburgers featured a phone number, the caller used to be a recording of Jack himself (as of 2019, the number is a sex hotline). In addition, many commercials have advertised free car antenna balls with every meal, thus increasing brand awareness. Often, different types of antenna balls were available during a holiday or major event or themed toward a sports team local to the restaurant. The antenna balls have since been discontinued due to the demise of the mast-type car antenna.

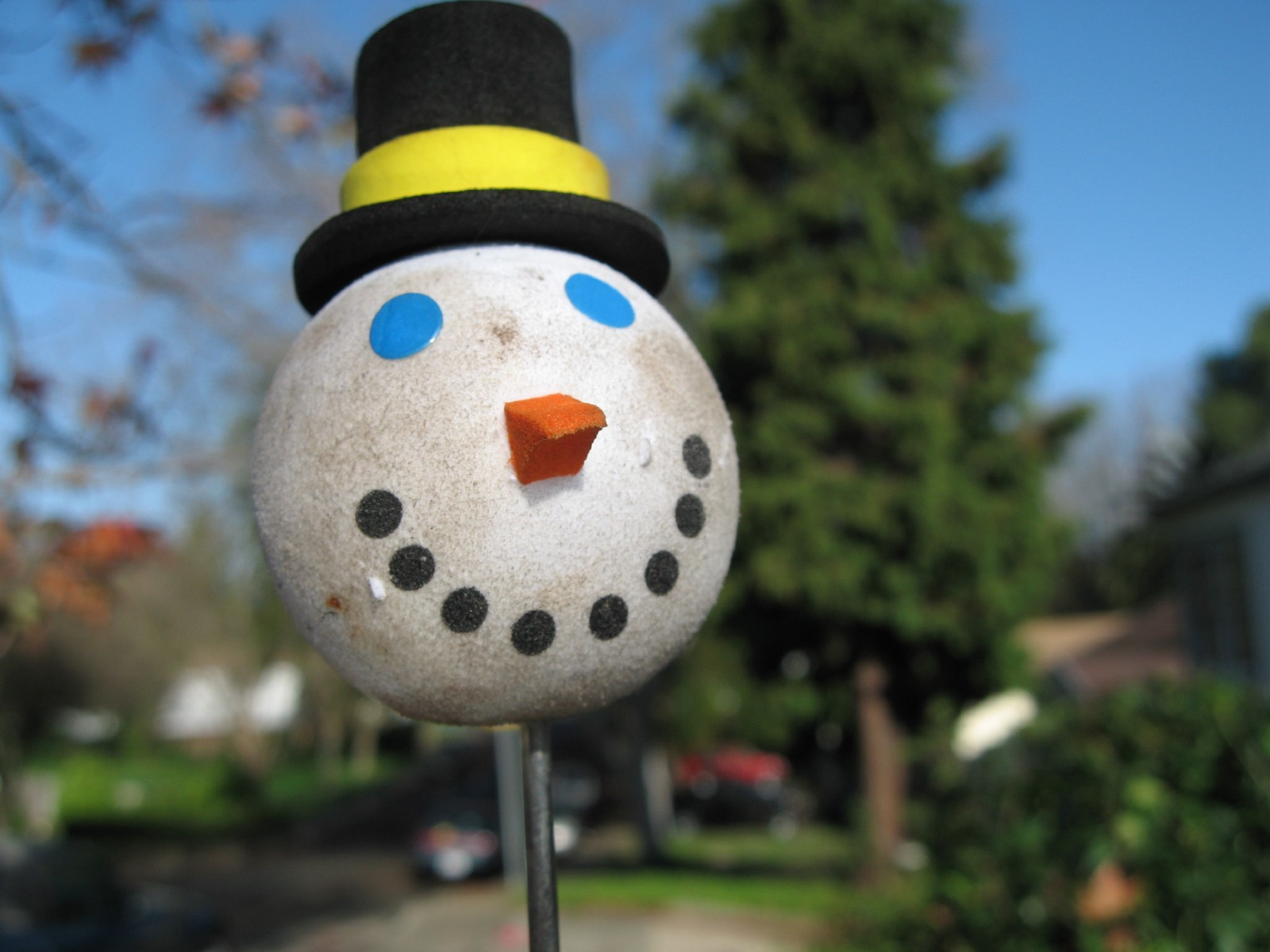
Popular Jack antenna ball (Christmas version)

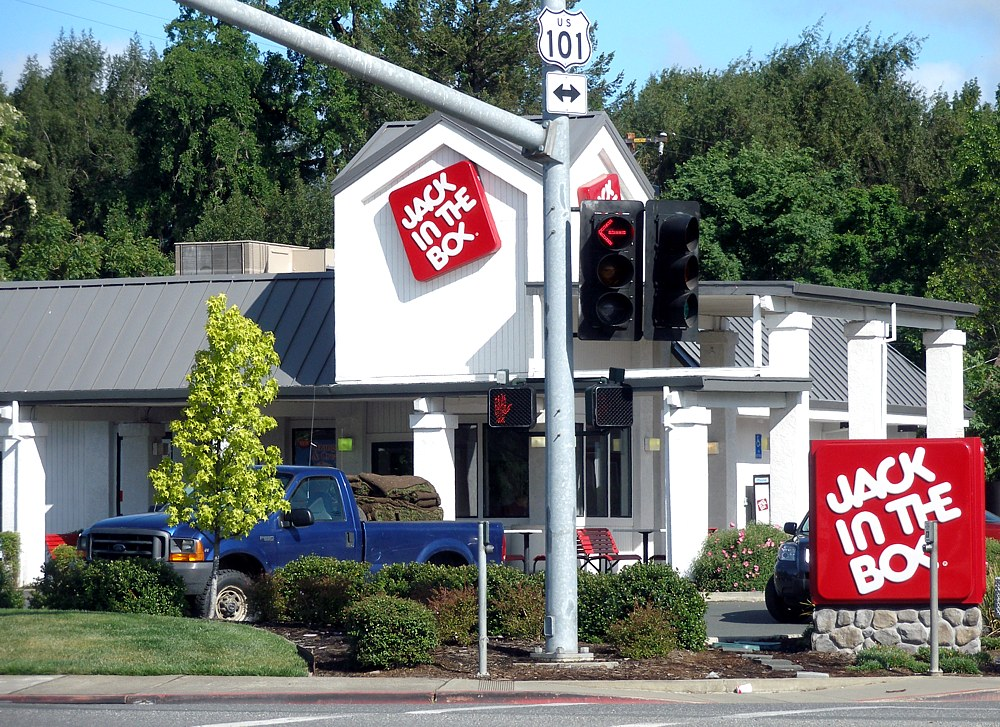
Jack in the Box restaurant in Willits, California

During the height of the now-defunct XFL, one of the continuing ad series involved a fictitious professional American football team owned by Jack. The team, called the Carnivores, played against teams such as the Tofu Eaters and the Vegans.

In 1997, a successful advertising campaign was launched using a fictional musical group called the Spicy Crispy Girls (a take-off of the Spice Girls, a British pop music girl group - at the time one of the most popular groups in the world), in comedic national television commercials. The commercials were used to promote the new Jack in the Box Spicy Crispy Chicken Sandwich (now known as Jack's Spicy Chicken), with the girls dancing in "the Jack groove." The Spicy Crispy Girls concept was used as a model for another successful advertising campaign called the 'Meaty Cheesy Boys' to promote the Ultimate Cheeseburger in 1999-2001 (see below). At the 1998 Association of Independent Commercial Producers (AICP) Show, one of the Spicy Crispy Girls commercials won the top award for humor.

The Meaty Cheesy Boys, a mock boy band to promote the Ultimate Cheeseburger, were created in 1999 during an ad campaign featuring an out-of-control advertising executive previously fired by Jack. The boy band would eventually perform their hit "Ultimate Cheeseburger" at the 1999 Billboard Music Awards. The same ad exec featured in a 2001 spot where a medical doctor made exaggerated claims of the benefits of fast food that it would cure baldness, help trim extra pounds, and remove wrinkles. Jack asks the ad exec incredulously, "Where did you find this guy?" The ad exec responds proudly, "Tobacco company."

In 2000, an ad involved a man washed up on a remote island with only a Jack in the Box antenna ball as a companion. Later that year, director Robert Zemeckis, claiming the agency had appropriated elements of his Oscar-nominated film Cast Away for the ad, had his lawsuit against the ad agency thrown out.

In April 2006, Jack in the Box launched an ad campaign called Bread is Back, taking a stab at the low-carbohydrate diets of recent years.

In 2006, Jack in the Box took the use of this perception creating a commercial featuring a typical stoner who is indecisive about ordering. When faced with a decision, the Jack in the Box figurine in his car tells him to "stick to the classics" and order 30 tacos, implying that he has the "munchies". This ad later stirred up controversy among a San Diego teen group who claimed that the ad was irresponsible showing a teenager who was under the influence of drugs. To protest, they presented the company with 2000 postcards protesting the ad, despite the fact that it had not aired since the beginning of the previous month. This commercial was redone in 2009 to feature the new logo and the new campaign.

Another ad touting the chain's milkshakes aired in 2001 and was shot in the stilted style of a 1970s-era antidrug spot, urging kids to "say no to fake shakes" and featured "Larry the Crime Donkey," a parody of McGruff the Crime Dog.

In 2007, Jack in the Box launched an advertising campaign for its sirloin hamburgers, comparing them to the Angus beef used by competitors including Carl's Jr., Hardee's, Wendy's, and Burger King. In May 2007, CKE Restaurants, parent company of Carl's Jr. and Hardee's, sued Jack in the Box in federal court over the ads. CKE alleged the commercials misled consumers by insinuating Angus beef came from a cow's anus, noting ads where Jack Box pointed to a diagram of a cow's rear end and executives laughed at the word "Angus". The lawsuit also disputed Jack in the Box's claim that sirloin, a cut of beef, was higher quality than Angus, a cattle breed. The parties settled the suit out of court in July 2007.

=== Logo ===
One variation has a miniature clown hat (dating back to October 1977) with three dots in the upper left-hand corner; the clown head was removed in 1982. In October 1977, the clown head was in a red box all by itself, with the company name either below or next to the box; signs in front of the restaurants had the clown head only. Most Jack in the Box locations opened before late 2008 had this logo, although the chain has been replacing them with the newer logo throughout the 2010s, along with general updating of their decor. Some locations continue to use this logo as their "Open/Closed" sign.

Logo from 1977 to 1982.

Logo from February 1982 to March 14, 2009; revived in December 2025.

Logo used from March 15, 2009 to October 3, 2022; still used as a secondary logo, and at most locations.

== Animal welfare ==
In 2012, Jack in the Box issued a commitment to phase out the use of gestation crates in its pork supply chain, citing animal-welfare concerns. As of August 14, 2025, Jack in the Box reaffirmed its intention to transition to open-pen gestation systems, in which sows are not kept in individual confinement crates during pregnancy. The company outlined a phased implementation schedule, targeting 25% of its pork supply from open-pen gestation environments by the end of 2024, 50% by the end of 2025, and full or near-full adoption by the end of 2026. Jack in the Box reported that it met its initial 2024 target of sourcing 25% of its pork from open-pen gestation systems.

== Food safety problems ==
=== Mislabeled meat ===
In 1981, horse meat labeled as beef was discovered at a Foodmaker plant that supplied hamburger and taco meat to Jack in the Box. The meat was originally from Profreeze of Australia and, during their checks on location, the food inspectors discovered other shipments destined for the United States that included kangaroo meat.

=== 1992–1993 E. coli scare and outbreak ===
In 1993, Jack in the Box suffered a major corporate crisis involving E. coli O157:H7 bacteria. Four children died of HUS. Another 600 were reported sick after eating undercooked patties contaminated with fecal material containing the bacteria at a location in Tacoma, Washington, and other parts of the Pacific Northwest. The chain was faced with several lawsuits, each of which was quickly settled (but left the chain nearly bankrupt and losing customers). At the time, Washington state law required that hamburgers be cooked to an internal temperature of at least 155 °F (68 °C), the temperature necessary to kill E. coli bacteria, although the FDA requirement at that time was only 140 °F (60 °C), which was the temperature Jack in the Box cooked. After the incident, Jack in the Box mandated that in all nationwide locations, their hamburgers be cooked to at least 155 °F (68 °C).

== Locations ==
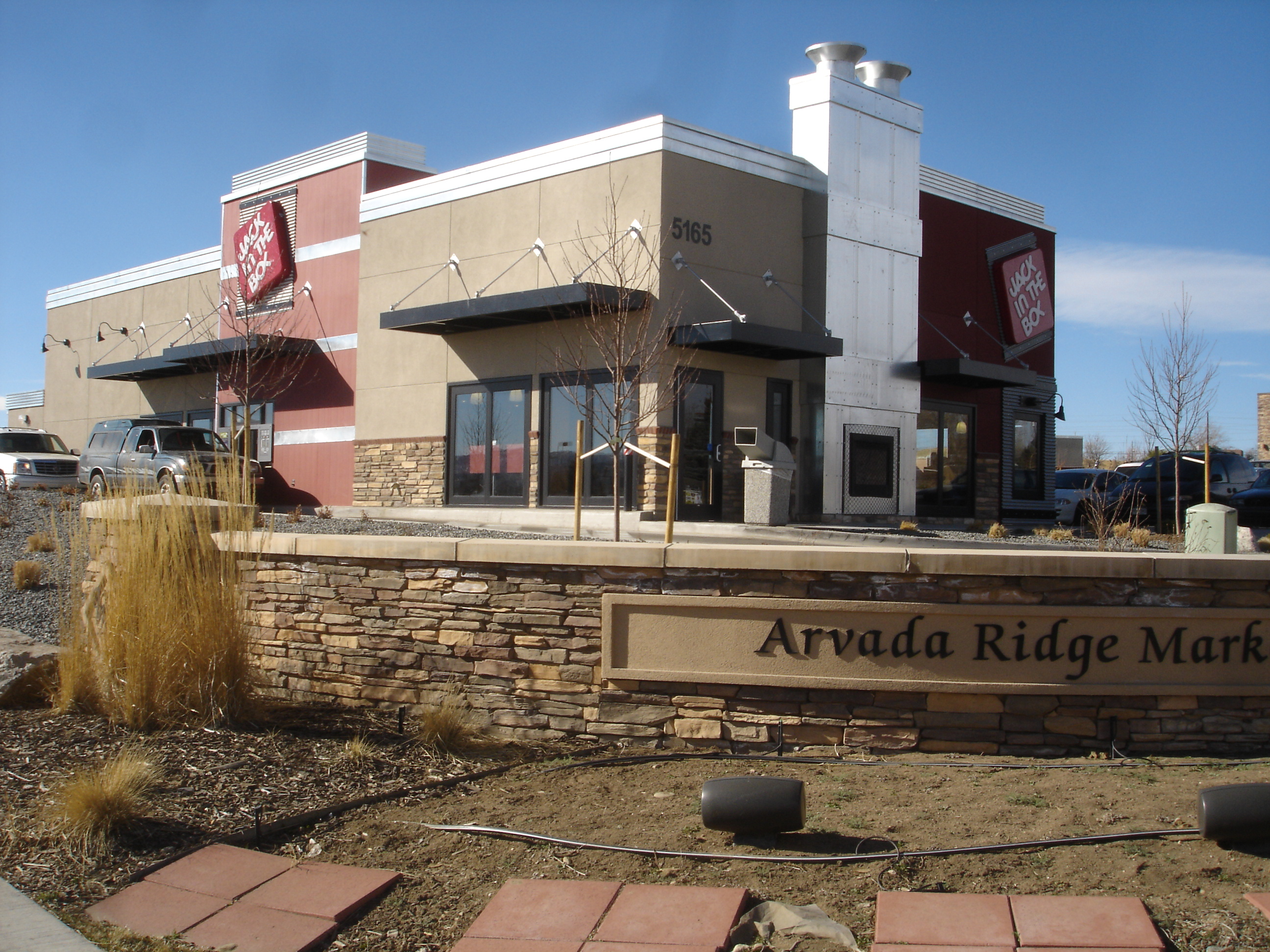
Second Colorado location in Arvada, with 1980s logo

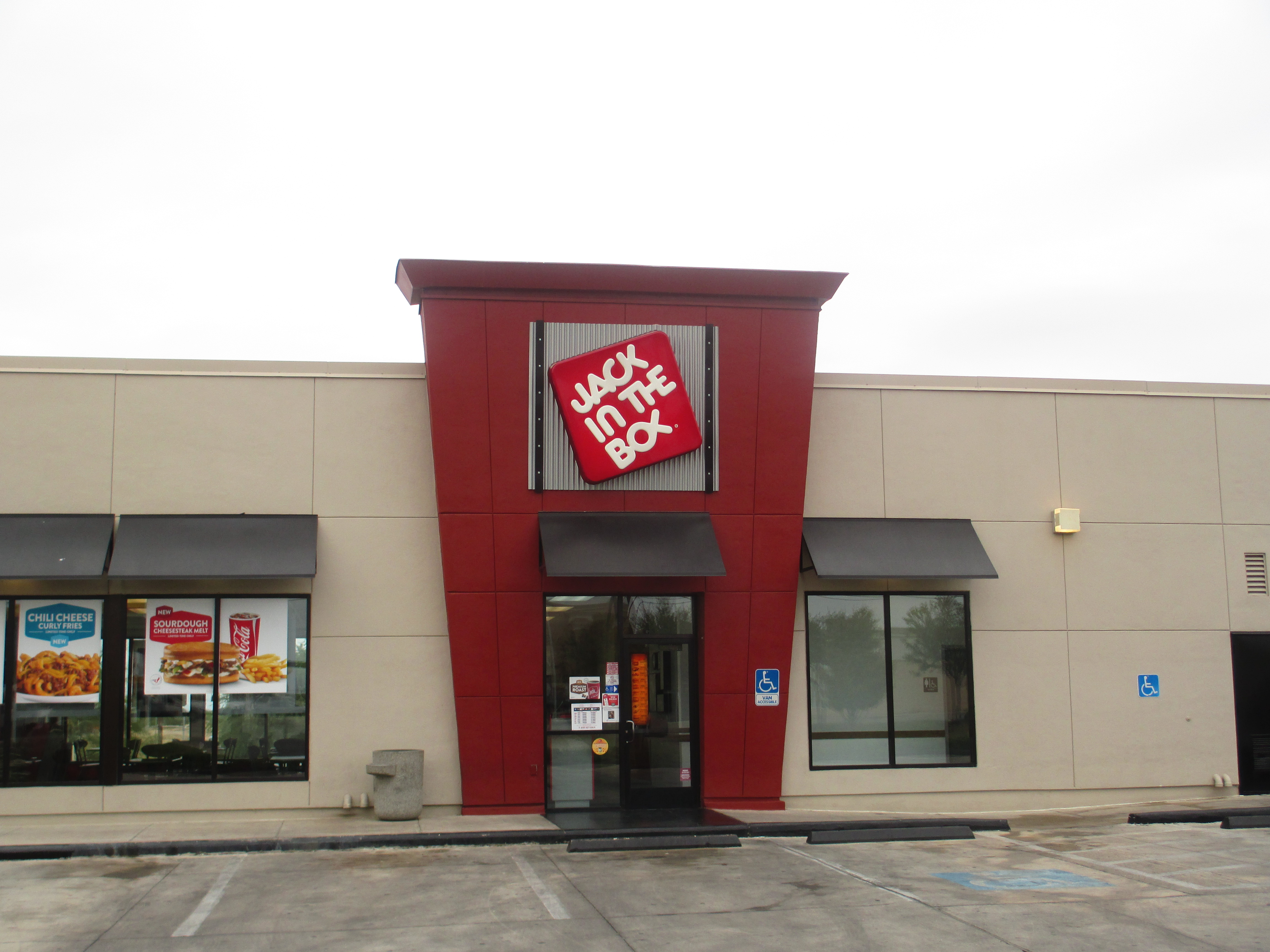
This Jack in the Box off U.S. Route 83 is one of five company outlets in Laredo, Texas.

In 2005, Jack in the Box announced plans for nationwide expansion by 2010. In support of this objective, the chain began airing ads in states several hundred miles from the nearest location. The expansion strategy at that time was targeted at Colorado, Delaware, Florida, and Texas. In 2007, the first new Colorado store opened in Golden, marking an end to Jack in the Box's 11-year-long absence from the state.

In Albuquerque, New Mexico, several locations opened in June 2009. Jack in the Box restaurants last made an appearance in the Albuquerque market about two decades prior.

In September 2010, 40 under-performing company-owned Jack in the Box restaurants located mostly in Texas and the Southeast were set to close.

In March 2011, Jack in the Box launched the Munchie Mobile in San Diego, a food truck that will serve Jack's burgers and fries. In June 2012, Jack in the Box launched their second food truck in the southeast region of the United States. Another truck was launched for the Northern Texas area in April 2013.

In January 2012, Jack in the Box opened its first of three locations in the Indianapolis area. A few months later, the first Ohio location opened in September 2012 in West Chester.

In May 2023, Jack in the Box showed interest in re-entering the Mexican market after a failed first attempt, when it briefly operated there in the early 1990s. In February 2024, Jack in the Box returned to Mexico, opening a location in Chihuahua City.

In July 2024, Jack in the Box announced plans to open several stores in the Chicago area in 2025. The chain previously operated in Chicago from the late 1960s until the 1980s. Eight locations, all in former Arby's, opened so far.

In 2024, Jack in the Box announced plans to expand into the Central Florida market, with franchise agreements for up to 20 locations in the Orlando area. Construction and permitting activity for multiple sites, including locations along John Young Parkway near The Mall at Millenia and in Lake Nona near Orlando International Airport, was reported in 2025. The chain opened its first Central Florida location in Longwood in February 2026, marking its return to the state after several decades.

In June 2026, all Jack in the Box locations in the greater Colorado Springs area closed, leaving no remaining operating stores listed in the region on the company's official locator. It was not immediately confirmed whether the local shutdowns were linked to the chain's "JACK on Track" restructuring plan announced in April 2025, which targeted 150 to 200 underperforming locations nationwide for closure through late 2025 and subsequent franchise agreement expirations.

== Sponsorship ==
In November 2017, Jack in the Box became a sponsor of the Dallas Fuel and Team Envy, a team in the Overwatch League and a professional video game-playing team respectively.

They are also a current sponsor for the Los Angeles Dodgers, the Los Angeles Rams, the Los Angeles Lakers, the San Francisco 49ers, and Arizona Diamondbacks.

== See also ==
- List of hamburger restaurants
