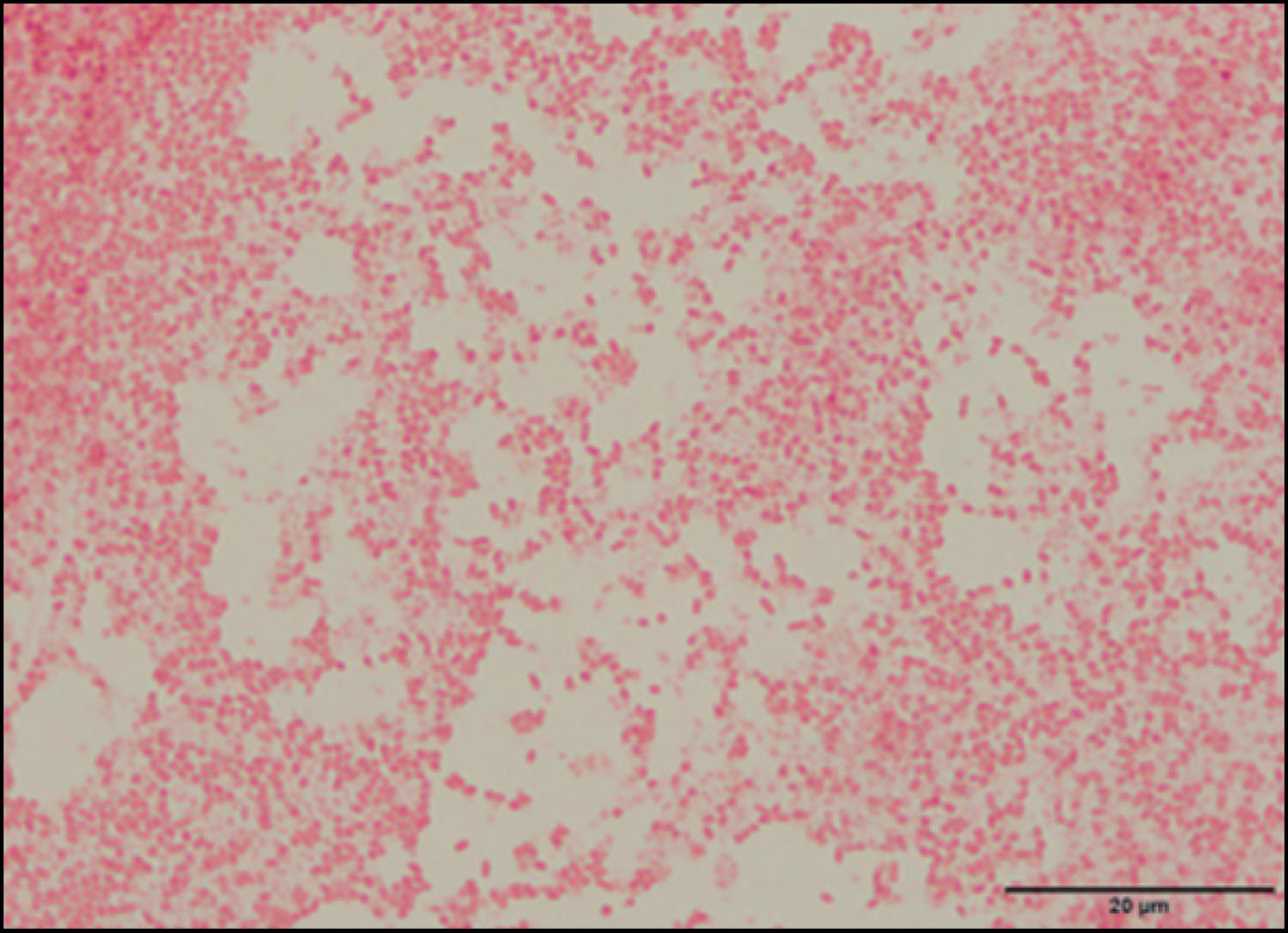

Scientific classification
- Domain: Bacteria
- Kingdom: Pseudomonadati
- Phylum: Pseudomonadota
- Class: Gammaproteobacteria
- Order: Enterobacterales
- Family: Enterobacteriaceae
- Genus: Pseudescherichia; Alnajar and Gupta, 2017

Type species
- Pseudescherichia vulneris (Brenner et al. 1983) Alnajar and Gupta, 2017

= Pseudescherichia =

Genus of bacteria

Pseudescherichia is a Gram-negative genus of non-spore-forming, facultatively anaerobic rod-shaped bacteria from the family Enterobacteriaceae. Based on conserved signature indels (CSIs) differentiating it from other members of this family, this genus and its sole species P. vulneris were divided from Escherichia, the genus of E. coli, in 2017.

A November 2022 preprint article has identified another member species from a Oryza sativa rice seedling growing in Arkansas, proposing the name P. oryzae.
