= Escherichia marmotae =

Scientific classification
- Domain: Bacteria
- Kingdom: Pseudomonadati
- Phylum: Pseudomonadota
- Class: Gammaproteobacteria
- Order: Enterobacterales
- Family: Enterobacteriaceae
- Genus: Escherichia
- Species: E. marmotae

Binomial name
- Escherichia marmotae Liu et al. 2015

Species of bacteria

Escherichia marmotae is a species of bacteria capable of causing infections in humans.

== Discovery ==
Escherichia marmotae was first isolated from the feces of the Himalayan marmot in the Tibetan Plateau. It was described in 2015 from seven isolates discovered during routine wildlife monitoring for Yersinia pestis.

== Description ==
Escherichia marmotae is gram-negative, non-motile, non-sporulating, and facultatively anaerobic. It tests positive for catalase, and negative for oxidase, urease, and indole. Cells take the form of short rods with widths ranging from 0.5-1 µm and lengths ranging from 1-2.5 µm. Colonies, when grown on LB agar for 24 hours at 37°C, appear circular, convex, and grayish white, measuring roughly 2 mm in diameter. Growth occurs between 25-37°C, with optimal growth observed at 37°C. E. marmotae is capable of fermentation of certain carbohydrates, including mannitol, rhamnose, xylose, sorbitol, and glycerol. E. marmotae is motile, although motility has been observed to decrease when grown at higher temperatures due to a reduction in motility-related gene expression.

== Pathogenicity ==
Escherichia marmotae has been implicated in human disease, including cases of sepsis, spondylodiscitis, and pyelonephritis. Some infections initially attributed to E. coli have retrospectively been classified as E. marmotae infections. Initial testing did not show evidence of antimicrobial resistance; later testing, however, suggests that some strains of E. marmotae are resistant to common antimicrobials such as penicillin, erithromycin, and ampicillin.
