= Escherichia =

- SEM micrograph of cluster of Escherichia coli bacteria. Each individual bacterium is oblong.

Scientific classification
- Domain: Bacteria
- Kingdom: Pseudomonadati
- Phylum: Pseudomonadota
- Class: Gammaproteobacteria
- Order: Enterobacterales
- Family: Enterobacteriaceae
- Genus: Escherichia; Castellani and Chalmers 1919 (Approved Lists 1980)

Type species
- Escherichia coli (Migula 1895) Castellani and Chalmers 1919 (Approved Lists 1980)

Other species
- Escherichia albertii; Escherichia fergusonii; Escherichia hermannii; Escherichia marmotae; Escherichia ruysiae; Escherichia whittamii

Genus of bacteria

Escherichia (/ˌɛʃəˈrɪkiə/ ESH-ə-RIK-ee-ə) is a genus of Gram-negative, non-spore-forming, facultatively anaerobic, rod-shaped bacteria from the family Enterobacteriaceae. In those species which are inhabitants of the gastrointestinal tracts of warm-blooded animals, Escherichia species provide a portion of the microbially derived vitamin K for their host. A number of the species of Escherichia are pathogenic. The genus is named after Theodor Escherich, the discoverer of Escherichia coli. Escherichia are facultative aerobes, with both aerobic and anaerobic growth, and an optimum temperature of 37 °C. Escherichia are usually motile by flagella, produce gas from fermentable carbohydrates, and do not decarboxylate lysine or hydrolyze arginine. Species include E. albertii, E. fergusonii, E. hermannii, E. ruysiae, E. marmotae and most notably, the model organism and clinically relevant E. coli. Formerly, Shimwellia blattae and Pseudescherichia vulneris were also classified in this genus.

== Pathogenesis ==
While many Escherichia are commensal members of the gut microbiota, certain strains of some species, most notably the pathogenic serotypes of E. coli, are human pathogens, and are the most common cause of urinary tract infections, significant sources of gastrointestinal disease, ranging from simple diarrhea to dysentery-like conditions, as well as a wide range of other pathogenic states classifiable in general as colonic escherichiosis. While E. coli is responsible for the vast majority of Escherichia-related pathogenesis, other members of the genus have also been implicated in human disease. Escherichia are associated with the imbalance of microbiota of the lower reproductive tract of women. These species are associated with inflammation.

== See also ==
- E. coli O157:H7
- List of bacterial genera named after personal names
