= Arc system =

The Arc system is a two-component system found in some bacteria that regulates gene expression in facultative anaerobes such as Escheria coli. Two-component system means that it has a sensor molecule and a response regulator. Arc is an abbreviation for Anoxic Redox Control system. Arc systems are instrumental in maintaining energy metabolism during transcription of bacteria. The ArcA response regulator looks at growth conditions and expresses genes to best suit the bacteria. The Arc B sensor kinase, which is a tripartite protein, is membrane bound and can autophosphorylate.

The Arc System was first reported in E. coli strains and subsequently many followed. ArcA/ArcB were first identified as playing an important role in regulation of aerobic and anaerobic pathways by Shiro Iuchi and E. C. Lin. These two scientists designed a genetic screen using the sdh-lacZ operon in a Δlac strain of E. coli. It was shown that mutations in arcA and arcB resulted in elevated levels of enzymes involved in anaerobic fermentation pathways. These two scientists are responsible for the name arc, which originally stood for aerobic respiration control.

== Structure of ArcB and ArcA ==
ArcB consists of 778 amino acids. It is a multipass transmembrane protein that passes through the inner membrane twice. The majority of the secondary structure of ArcB is alpha helices; five alpha helices and one beta sheet. The two transmembrane portions of the protein are 20 amino acid long alpha helices that are both rich in hydrophobic amino acids. Amino acids 79-778 are cytoplasmic, 93% of the protein is cytoplasmic. Both the sensory and regulator regions of ArcB are present in this cytoplasmic domain.

ArcA consists of 238 amino acids. This is an oligomeric protein with two identical subunits; each subunit composed of 119 amino acids, five alpha helices, and six beta sheets. Amino acids 134-234 have the DNA binding domain which can activate or suppress gene expression. There are 76 DNA binding sites in the E. coli genome, however, ArcA directly regulates approximately 30 different operons.

== Mechanism ==
ArcB is a membrane-bound sensor histidine kinase. It is unusual in that it contains three distinct signaling domains. It senses oxygen levels in the cell by interacting with reduced quinone. When reduced quinone levels are low, it signals that the cell is engaged in aerobic respiration. When reduced quinone levels are high, it signals that the cell is unable to perform aerobic respiration. This is typically due to insufficient levels of oxygen, which acts as the terminal electron receptor in the electron transport chain. ArcB is then able to activate or deactivate ArcA, the response regulator, which can then travel to the chromosome and regulate gene expression.

ArcA is activated via phosphorylation. When oxygen levels are low (anaerobic conditions), ArcB autophosphorylates. This inorganic phosphate is then transferred via a four amino acid phosphorelay to ArcA. Phosphorylated ArcA is then able to attach to specific, consensus gene sequences on the chromosome regulating approximately 30 different operons. ArcA is able to acts as both a repressor and an activator depending on which operon it attaches.

When oxygen levels are high (aerobic conditions), ArcB acts as a phosphatase, removing the inorganic phosphate group from ArcA. Without the attached phosphate group, ArcA is unable to bind to DNA and genes return to their original, aerobic levels of expression. This allows the cell to engage in metabolic pathways that are most advantageous for the current conditions of the cell. Dephosphorylation utilizes the same phosphorelay as phosphorylation, but it is operated in reverse.

Without the Arc system being present throughout various strains of anaerobic bacteria, gene expression could not efficiently control the metabolism during the replication of genetic material. Under many growth conditions where oxygen is not present, the ArcB sensor kinase (which is membrane-bound) turns to autophosphorylates which is a process proven to be more efficient when certain fermenting metabolites such as Pyruvate, Acetate, and D-Lactate.

== Gene regulation ==
The Arc system connects the electron transport chain to regulation of certain genes, allowing aerobic respiration to occur in the presence of oxygen and fermentation to take place when no oxygen is present. This is done through the connection of ArcB with quinones from the electron transport chain. Oxidized quionones, from the electron transport chain, act to inhibit autophosphorylation of ArcB during aerobic respiration. This in turn prevents the phosphorylation of ArcA, turning off the activated operons.

It has been determined that the Arc system regulates as many as 30 genes, with repression of the following examples: cytochrome o oxidase, cytochrome d oxidase, and various gluconeogenic enzymes, such as for the glyoxylate cycle, and fatty acid oxidation. It also induces the expression of Pyruvate formate lyase.

One of the major genes controlled is the sdh-lacZ operon. This, in part, codes for the synthesis of succinate dehydrogenase, a key element in the TCA cycle. ArcA turns expression of the sdh-lacZ operon off in the presence of oxygen, stopping procession of the TCA cycle. It also activates lctD and pyruvate formate lyase. These genes are critical in the lactic acid fermentation process. They are activated in anoxic conditions to allow the cell to continue producing ATP and growing even in less favorable conditions. ArcA represses many of the other enzymes involved in the TCA cycle as well including flavoprotein dehydrogenases, and ubiquinones oxidases. It also represses enzymes involved in synthesizing glyoxylate, some dehydrognases used in aerobic growth, and enzymes involved in fatty acid oxidation. Activated operons include genes for the pyruvate formate-lyase pathway and enzymes involved in synthesizing cobalamin.

Another of the genes effected codes for the production of certain cytochromes. ArcA respresses cytochrome bo oxidase and activates cytochrome bd oxidase. Cytochromes are classified based on the hemes they possess, in this case cytochrome bo possesses a heme c while cytochorme bd oxidase psoseses a heme d. Cytochormes bo oxidase is one of the main electron transporters during the elctron transport chain of aerobic respiration. It has the ability to reduce most organic compounds found in cellular metabolism. Cytochrome bd oxidase is activated in anaerobic conditions. It has a higher affinity for oxygen than cytochrome bo oxidase which may be useful to cells in anoxic conditions.
