= Escherichia fergusonii =

Scientific classification
- Domain: Bacteria
- Kingdom: Pseudomonadati
- Phylum: Pseudomonadota
- Class: Gammaproteobacteria
- Order: Enterobacterales
- Family: Enterobacteriaceae
- Tribe: Escherichieae
- Genus: Escherichia
- Species: E. fergusonii

Binomial name
- Escherichia fergusonii Farmer et al. 1985

Species of bacterium

Escherichia fergusonii is a Gram-negative, rod-shaped species of bacterium. Closely related to the well-known species Escherichia coli, E. fergusonii was first isolated from samples of human blood. The species is named for American microbiologist William W. Ferguson.

== Pathogenicity ==
Some strains of E. fergusonii are pathogenic. It is known to infect open wounds in humans and may also cause bacteraemia or urinary tract infections. Strains causing these infections have been found to be highly resistant to the antibiotic ampicillin, though some are also resistant to gentamicin and chloramphenicol. An antibiotic-resistant strain of the species was found to be associated with an incidence of cystitis in a 52-year-old woman in 2008.
