= Escherichia albertii =

Scientific classification
- Domain: Bacteria
- Kingdom: Pseudomonadati
- Phylum: Pseudomonadota
- Class: Gammaproteobacteria
- Order: Enterobacterales
- Family: Enterobacteriaceae
- Genus: Escherichia
- Species: E. albertii

Binomial name
- Escherichia albertii (Huys et al. 2003)

Species of bacterium

Escherichia albertii is a Gram-negative species of bacteria within the same genus as E. coli. It was recognised to cause disease after being isolated from the stools of children with diarrhea in Bangladesh, and was originally thought to be Hafnia alvei based on biochemical assays. The bacterium was reclassified in 2003 as a novel species based on its genetic features, and was named E. albertii in honour of the microbiologist who first described the species. E. albertii differs from typical E. coli in being nonmotile and unable to ferment lactose.

As a human gastrointestinal pathogen, E. albertii is often linked to food- or water-borne outbreaks of disease, and can cause sporadic cases of bacteraemia. The species may be misidentified as Enteropathogenic E. coli due to its production of intimin. It is also responsible for disease or subclinical infection in domestic and wild birds, where it may be a reservoir for human disease.
