= BolA-like protein family =

BolA
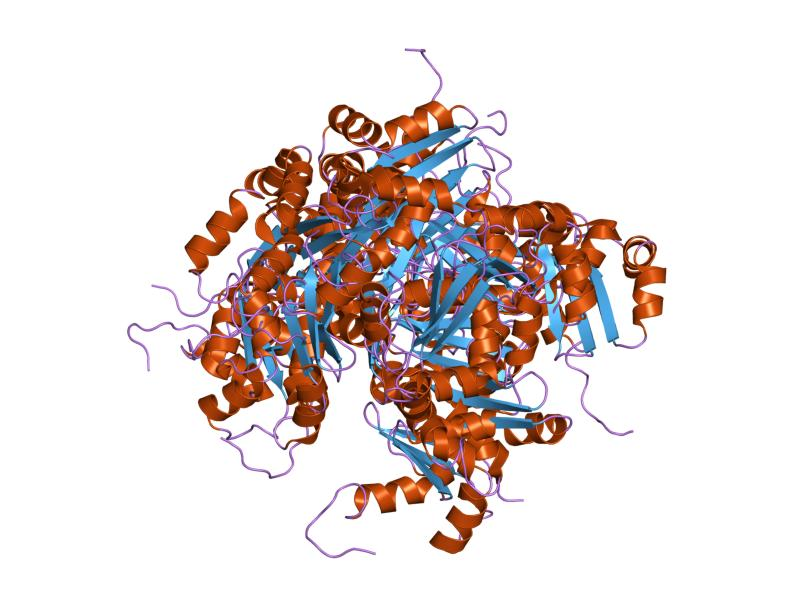
- solution structure of protein yrba from escherichia coli: northeast structural genomics consortium target er115

Identifiers
- Symbol: BolA
- Pfam: PF01722
- InterPro: IPR002634
- SCOP2: 1v9j / SCOPe / SUPFAM
Available protein structures:
- PDB: IPR002634 PF01722 (ECOD; PDBsum)
- AlphaFold: IPR002634; PF01722

In molecular biology, the BolA-like protein family consists of the morpho-protein BolA from Escherichia coli, the Fra2 protein from Saccharomyces cerevisiae, and various homologs. The BolA protein is a DNA-binding regulator; the Fra2 protein is an iron sulfur cluster protein that binds Grx3/4 and is involved in regulating iron levels .

In E. coli, over-expression of this protein causes round morphology and may be involved in switching the cell between elongation and septation systems during cell division. The expression of BolA is growth rate regulated and is induced during the transition into the stationary phase. BolA is also induced by stress during early stages of growth and may have a general role in stress response. It has also been suggested that BolA can induce the transcription of penicillin binding proteins 6 and 5.
