= Escherichia hermannii =

Scientific classification
- Domain: Bacteria
- Kingdom: Pseudomonadati
- Phylum: Pseudomonadota
- Class: Gammaproteobacteria
- Order: Enterobacterales
- Family: Enterobacteriaceae
- Tribe: Escherichieae
- Genus: Escherichia
- Species: E. hermannii

Binomial name
- Escherichia hermannii Brenner et al. 1983

Species of bacterium

Escherichia hermannii is a Gram-negative, rod-shaped species of bacterium. Strains of this species were originally isolated from human wounds, sputum, and stool. The species is named for American microbiologists George J. Hermann and Lloyd G. Herman.

A 2016 publication proposed reclassifying E. hermannii as a species of a new genus within the Enterobacteriaceae, Atlantibacter, a change which would rename the species to Atlantibacter hermannii. The LPSN considers the new name a synonym, not validly published (i.e. made outside of IJSB and IJSEM) under the ICNP. GTDB and NCBI agree with the 2016 reassignment.

== Pathogenicity ==
E. hermannii is generally considered nonpathogenic but has been isolated from human wounds, eye infections, and blood.
