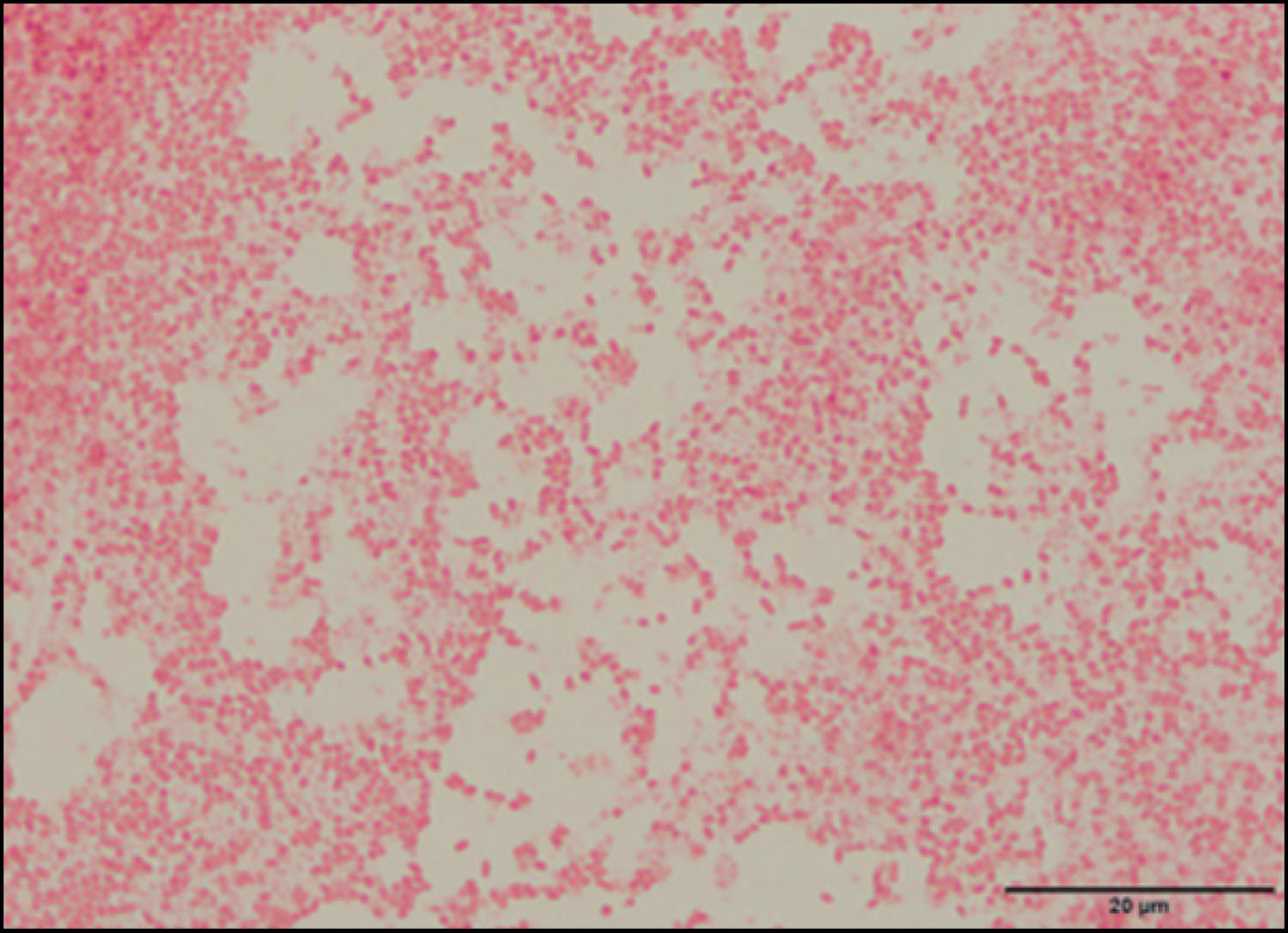

Scientific classification
- Domain: Bacteria
- Kingdom: Pseudomonadati
- Phylum: Pseudomonadota
- Class: Gammaproteobacteria
- Order: Enterobacterales
- Family: Enterobacteriaceae
- Genus: Pseudescherichia
- Species: P. vulneris

Binomial name
- Pseudescherichia vulneris (Brenner et al. 1983) Alnajar and Gupta, 2017

= Pseudescherichia vulneris =

Species of bacterium

Pseudescherichia vulneris is a Gram-negative bacterial species. P. vulneris is a fermentative, oxidase-negative, motile rod, which holds characteristics of the family Enterobacteraceae. This bacterium can colonize in the respiratory tract, genital tract, stool, and urinary tract. However, P. vulneris is most often associated with wounds and has been known to colonize open wounds of both humans and animals. This association gave the bacterium its species name, vulneris, which is Latin for wound. It has also been infrequently reported in cases of meningitis. It was identified as Escherichia vulneris in 1982 with a 2017 genomic analysis of its original genus resulting in the creation of its new genus Pseudescherichia.

== Morphology ==
P. vulneris has a rod-like (bacilli) shape, and it achieves motility using peritrichous flagella (covering the whole body of the bacteria). P. vulneris is facultatively anaerobic, and is not spore-forming. Optimal growth occurs at 35-37 °C, and it can colonize on a simple nutrient medium. Colonies are generally smooth and low convex with shiny surfaces.

== Resistance ==
Susceptibility studies have shown P. vulneris is susceptible to 14 antibiotics, including third-generation cephalosporins, aminoglycosides, trimethoprim, and sulfamethoxazole-trimethoprim. Similar studies have shown they have some type of resistance to the antibiotics penicillin and clindamycin, and were also marginally resistant to carbenicillin, erythromycin, tetracycline, chloramphenicol, and nitrofurantoin.

== Recorded cases of infection ==
=== Studied cases ===
Twelve Hawaiian patients infected with strains of P. vulneris were isolated. Except for two of the infected, evidence was found of soft tissue infections from multiple bacteria, caused by the P. vulneris. The two without soft tissue infections had purulent conjunctivitis. However, none of these cases had colonies of P. vulneris considered to be abundant or pathogenic. In one study, P. vulneris strains were injected into mice using both 10^{7} cells and 10^{6} cells. The 10^{7} strain failed to cause serious symptoms in the infected mice. None of the 10^{6} strains was able to produce persisting infections.
