= Synthetic ecosystems =

Synthetic ecosystems are on-chip integrated devices where cellular cultures (individuals) and ecosystem services - such as the renewal of growth, delivery of regulatory signals as well as removal of waste - are patterned into an integrated fluidic device using principles of landscape ecology, physiology and cell signaling.
