= Streptomyces isolates =

Species of bacterium

Streptomyces isolates have yielded the majority of human, animal, and agricultural antibiotics, as well as a number of fundamental chemotherapy medicines. Streptomyces is the largest antibiotic-producing genus of Actinomycetota, producing chemotherapy, antibacterial, antifungal, antiparasitic drugs, and immunosuppressants. Streptomyces isolates are typically initiated with the aerial hyphal formation from the mycelium.

== Anticancer medicines ==
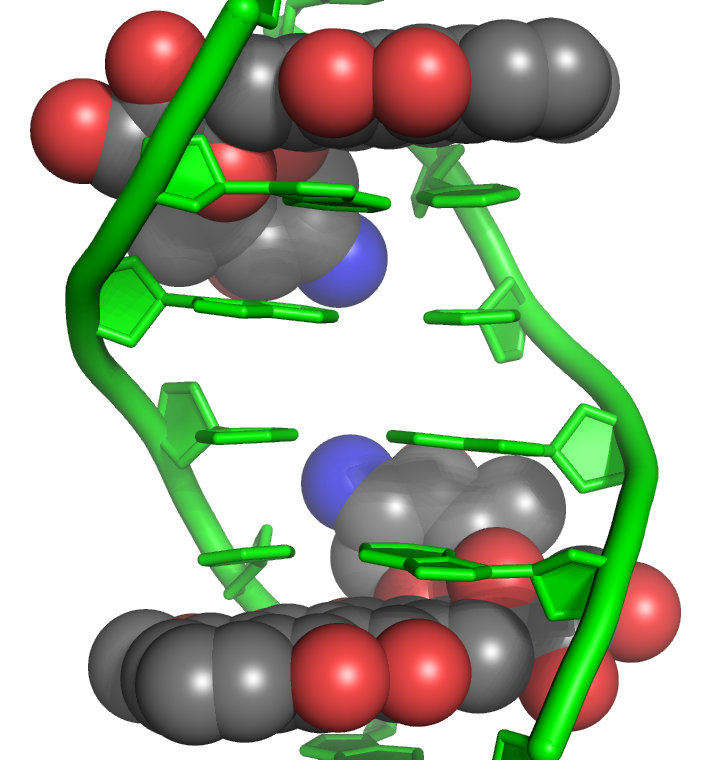
Doxorubicin intercalating DNA.

Streptomyces, yielded the medicines doxorubicin (Doxil), daunorubicin (DaunoXome), and streptozotocin (Zanosar). Doxorubicin is the precursor to valrubicin (Valstar), myocet, and pirarubicin. Daunorubicin is the precursor to idarubicin (Idamycin), epirubicin (Ellence), and zorubicin.

Streptomyces is the original source of dactinomycin (Cosmegen), bleomycin (Blenoxane), pingyangmycin (Bleomycin A_{5}), mitomycin C (Mutamycin), rebeccamycin, staurosporine (precursor to stauprimide and midostaurin), neothramycin, aclarubicin, tomaymycin, sibiromycin, and mazethramycin.

Derivatives of Streptomycetes isolate migrastatin, including isomigrastatin, dorrigocin A & B, and the synthetic derivative macroketone, are being researched for anticancer activity.

== Antibiotics ==
Most clinical antibiotics were found during the "golden age of antibiotics" (1940s–1960s). Actinomycin was the first antibiotic isolated from Streptomyces in 1940, followed by streptomycin three years later. Antibiotics from Streptomyces isolates (including various aminoglycosides) would go on to comprise over two-thirds of all marketed antibiotics.

Streptomyces-derived antibiotics include:

- Chloramphenicol (Streptomyces venezuelae)
- Daptomycin (Streptomyces roseosporus)
- Fosfomycin (Streptomyces fradiae)
- Lincomycin (Streptomyces lincolnensis)
- Neomycin (Streptomyces fradiae)
- Platensimycin (Streptomyces platensis)
- Puromycin (Streptomyces alboniger)
- Spenolimycin (Streptomyces gilvospiralis)
- Streptomycin (Streptomyces griseus)
- Tetracycline (Streptomyces rimosus and Streptomyces aureofaciens)
- Kettapeptin
- Niphimycin

Clavulanic acid (Streptomyces clavuligerus) is used in combination with some antibiotics (such as amoxicillin) to weaken bacterial-resistance. Novel anti-infectives being developed include the guadinomines (from Streptomyces sp. K01-0509), inhibitors of the type III secretion system.

Non-Streptomyces actinomycetes, filamentous fungi, and non-filamentous bacteria, have also yielded important antibiotics.

== Antifungals ==
Nystatin (Streptomyces noursei), amphotericin B (Streptomyces nodosus), ossamycin (Streptomyces hygroscopicus), and natamycin (Streptomyces natalensis) are antifungals isolated from Streptomyces.

== Immunosuppressants ==
Sirolimus (Rapamycin), ascomycin, and tacrolimus were isolated from Streptomyces. Pimecrolimus is a derivative of ascomycin. Ubenimex is derived from S. olivoreticuli.

== Antiparasitics ==
Streptomyces avermitilis synthesizes the antiparasitic ivermectin (Stromectol). Other antiparasitics made by Streptomyces include, milbemycin oxime, moxidectin, and milbemycin.

== Biotechnology ==
Biosynthesis of sirolimus

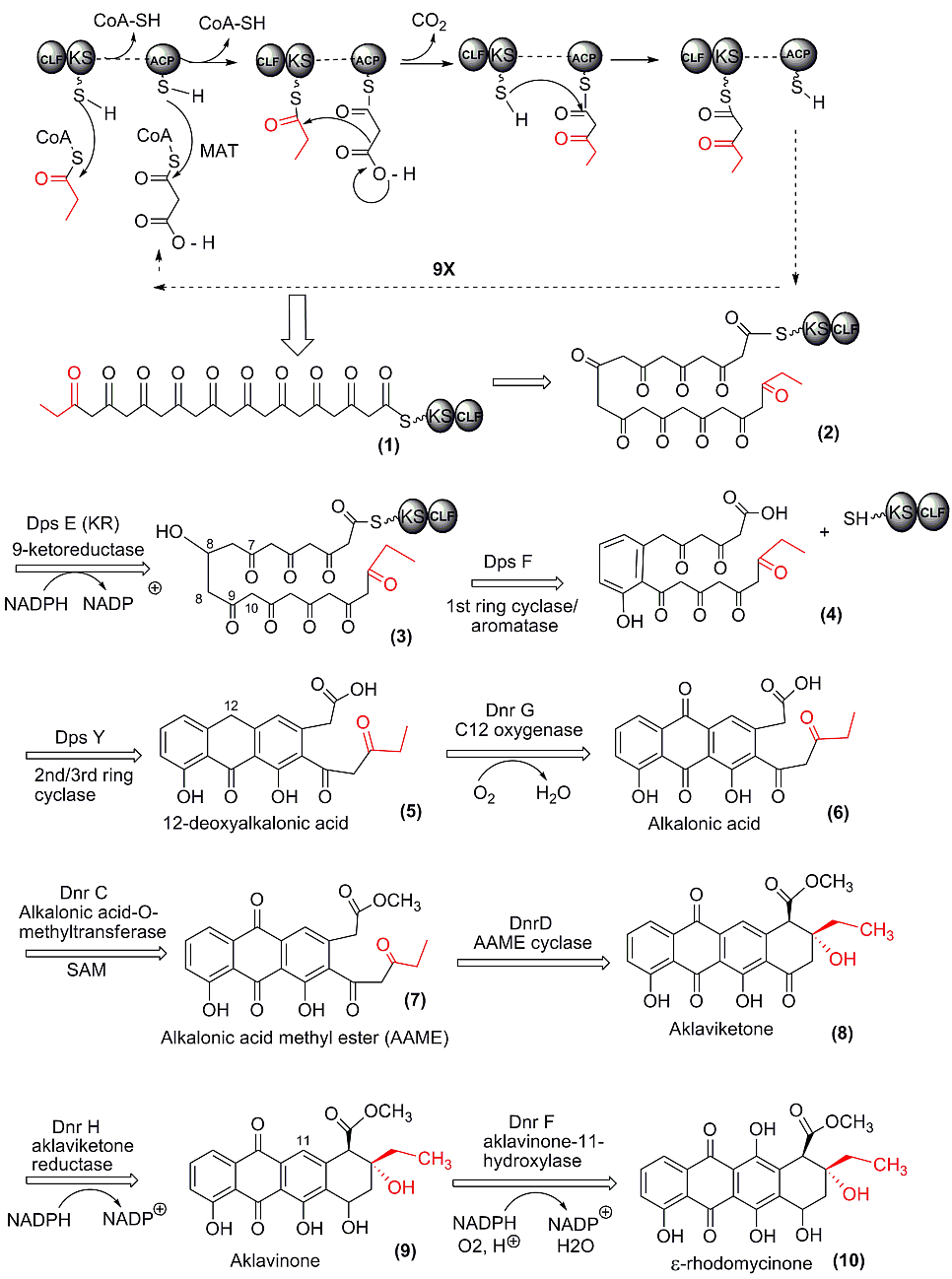
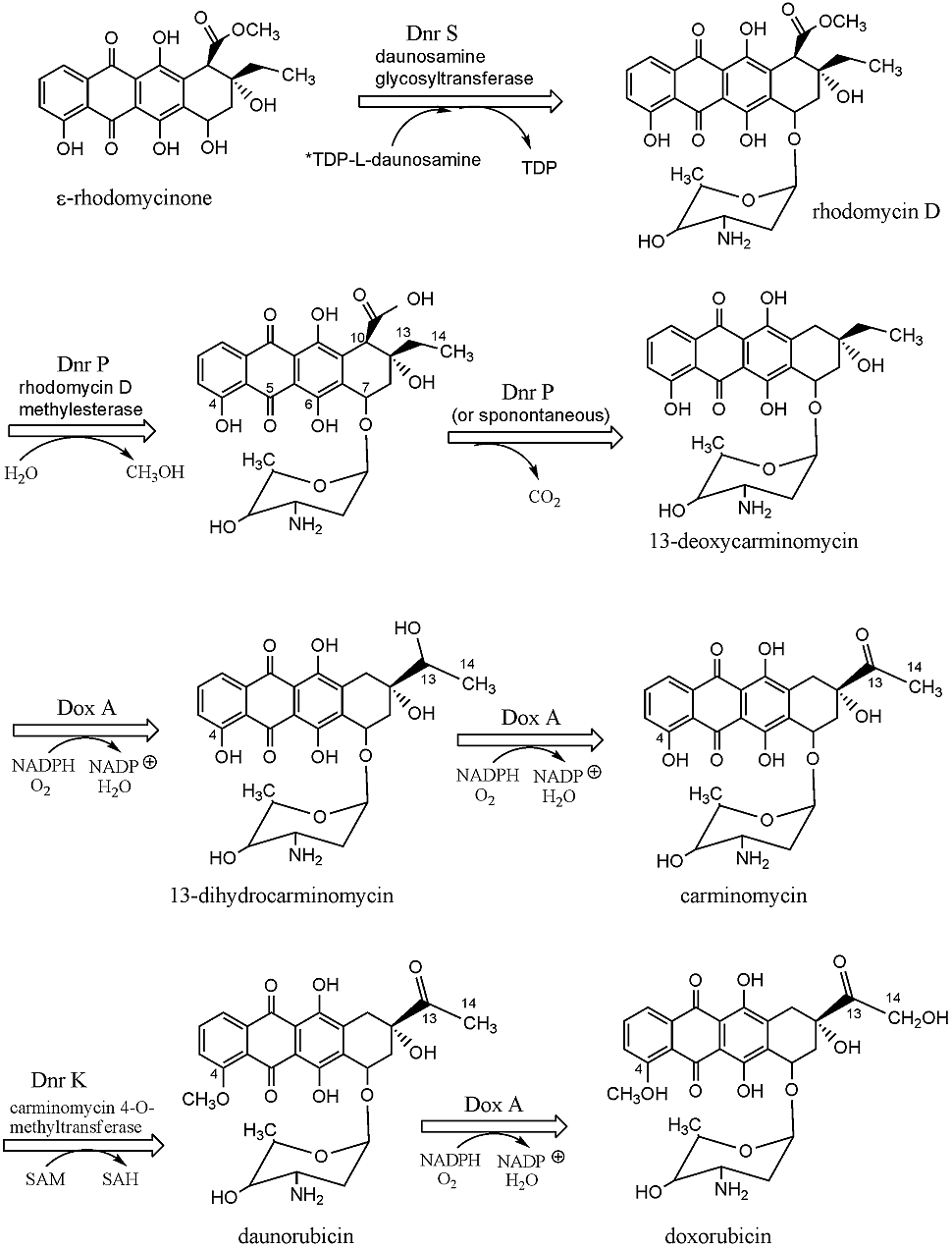
Biosynthesis of doxorubicin

Traditionally, Escherichia coli is the choice bacterium to express eukaryotic and recombinant genes. E. coli is well understood and has a successful track record producing insulin, the artemisinin precursor artemisinic acid, and filgrastim (Neupogen). However, use of E. coli has limitations including misfolding of eukaryotic proteins, insolubility issues, deposition in inclusion bodies, low secretion efficiency, secretion to periplasmic space.

Streptomyces offers potential advantages including superior secretion mechanisms, higher yields, a simpler end-product purification process, making Streptomyces an attractive alternative to E. coli and Bacillus subtilis.

Streptomyces coelicolor, Streptomyces avermitilis, Streptomyces griseus, and Saccharopolyspora erythraea, are capable of secondary metabolite production. Streptomyces coelicolor has shown useful for the heterologous expression of proteins. Methods like "ribosome engineering" have been used to achieve 180-fold higher yields with S. coelicolor.

== Other ==
StreptomeDB, a directory of Streptomyces isolates, contains over 2400 compounds isolated from more than 1900 strains. Streptomyces hygroscopicus and Streptomyces viridochromeogenes produce the herbicide bialaphos. Expansion of Streptomyces screenings have included endophytes, extremophiles, and marine varieties.

A recent screening of TCM extracts revealed a Streptomyces that produces a number of antitubercular pluramycins. Wailupemycins are bio-active pyrones isolated from marine Streptomyces.

Mayamycin has been shown to have cytotoxic properties.

Germicidin are a group of four compounds that act as autoregulatory inhibitors of spore germination.

== See also ==
- Bacillus isolates
- Biotechnology in pharmaceutical manufacturing
- Corynebacterium glutamicum, the industrial/pharmaceutical bacterium responsible for manufacturing a number of amino acids
- Erwinia chrysanthemi, a bacterium used to produce the chemotherapy medicine asparaginase
- Fungal isolates
- Medicinal molds
- Polyene antimycotics
- Sponge isolates
