= Neopluramycin =

Names
- IUPAC name 6-{2-[(2E)-2-Buten-2-yl]-8-[4-(dimethylamino)-5-hydroxy-6-methyltetrahydro-2H-pyran-2-yl]-11-hydroxy-5-methyl-4,7,12-trioxo-7,12-dihydro-4H-naphtho[2,3-h]chromen-10-yl}-4-(dimethylamino)-2,4-dimethyltetrahydro-2H-pyran-3-yl acetate

Identifiers
CAS Number	11081-47-3
3D model (JSmol)	Interactive image
ChEMBL	ChEMBL1967599
ChemSpider	4514107
PubChem CID	5359061
- InChI: InChI=1S/C41H50N2O10/c1-12-18(2)28-16-27(45)31-19(3)13-25-33(39(31)53-28)38(49)34-32(37(25)48)23(29-15-26(42(8)9)35(46)20(4)50-29)14-24(36(34)47)30-17-41(7,43(10)11)40(21(5)51-30)52-22(6)44/h12-14,16,20-21,26,29-30,35,40,46-47H,15,17H2,1-11H3/b18-12+ Key: FGTVZROOHPSJNZ-LDADJPATSA-N
- SMILES: C/C=C(\C)/C1=CC(=O)C2=C(O1)C3=C(C=C2C)C(=O)C4=C(C3=O)C(=C(C=C4C5CC(C(C(O5)C)O)N(C)C)C6CC(C(C(O6)C)OC(=O)C)(C)N(C)C)O

Properties
Chemical formula	C_{41}H_{50}N_{2}O_{10}
Molar mass	730.855 g·mol^{−1}
- Except where otherwise noted, data are given for materials in their standard state (at 25 °C [77 °F], 100 kPa). Infobox references

Neopluramycin is an antibiotic that inhibits nucleic acid synthesis. It has been isolated from the cultured broth of a strain of Streptomyces pluricolorescens as orange crystals, and analytical data and molecular weight determination are consistent with the empirical formula C_{41}H_{50}N_{2}O_{10}.

Neopluramycin resembles pluramycin A, but is differentiated by its antibacterial spectrum, toxicity, thin-layer chromatography, and infrared absorption spectrum.

Neopluramycin inhibits growth of Gram-positive bacteria, leukemia L-1210 in mice and Yoshida rat sarcoma cells in tissue culture.
