= C27H39NO7 =

The molecular formula C_{27}H_{39}NO_{7} (molar mass: 489.60 g/mol, exact mass: 489.2727 u) may refer to:

- Isomigrastatin
- Migrastatin
