= FHIPEP protein family =

Family of proteins with type III secretion pathway apparatus

FHIPEP

Identifiers
- Symbol: FHIPEP
- Pfam: PF00771
- InterPro: IPR001712
- PROSITE: PDOC00763
- TCDB: 3.A.6
Available protein structures:
- Pfam: structures / ECOD
- PDB: RCSB PDB; PDBe; PDBj
- PDBsum: structure summary

In molecular biology, the FHIPEP protein family (Flagellar/Hr/Invasion Proteins Export Pore family) consists of a number of proteins that constitute the type III secretion (or signal peptide-independent) pathway apparatus. This mechanism translocates proteins lacking an N-terminal signal peptide across the cell membrane in one step, as it does not require an intermediate periplasmic process to cleave the signal peptide. It is a common pathway amongst Gram-negative bacteria for secreting toxic and flagellar proteins.

The pathway apparatus comprises three components: two within the inner membrane and one within the outer. An FHIPEP protein is located within the inner membrane, although it is unknown which component it constitutes. FHIPEP proteins have all about 700 amino acid residues. Within the sequence, the N terminus is highly conserved and hydrophobic, suggesting that this terminus is embedded within the membrane, with 6-8 transmembrane (TM) domains, while the C terminus is less conserved and appears to be devoid of TM regions. It is possible that members of the FHIPEP family serve as pores for the export of specific proteins.
