= C6H13NO3 =

The molecular formula C_{6}H_{13}NO_{3} (molar mass: 147.17 g/mol, exact mass: 147.0895 u) may refer to:

- Afegostat, also known as isofagomine
- Daunosamine
