= Lydicamycin =

Names
- IUPAC name 2-[21-[1-[(2,5-Dihydro-4-hydroxy-2-oxo-1H-pyrrol-3-yl)carbonyl]-1,2,4a,5,6,7,8,8a-octahydro-5,6-dihydroxy-1,3-dimethyl-2-naphthalenyl]-2,6,10,14,18-pentahydroxy-5,11,17,19-tetramethyl-4,8,12,16-heneicosatetraen-1-yl] 1-pyrrolidinecarboximidamide

Identifiers
CAS Number	133352-27-9
3D model (JSmol)	Interactive image
ChemSpider	59700986
PubChem CID	54715242
- InChI: InChI=1S/C47H74N4O10/c1-26(37(54)10-7-11-38(55)27(2)13-18-33(53)24-31-9-8-22-51(31)46(48)49)12-16-32(52)17-14-28(3)42(58)29(4)15-19-35-30(5)23-34-36(20-21-39(56)43(34)59)47(35,6)44(60)41-40(57)25-50-45(41)61/h7,10,12-14,16,23,26,29,31-39,42-43,52-56,58-60H,8-9,11,15,17-22,24-25H2,1-6H3,(H3,48,49)(H,50,61)/b10-7+,16-12+,27-13+,28-14+,44-41+/t26?,29?,31?,32?,33?,34-,35-,36-,37?,38?,39-,42?,43+,47+/m1/s1 Key: BCOQUXPMOLQABB-CTAFOSPESA-N
- SMILES: CC1=C[C@@H]2[C@@H](CC[C@H]([C@H]2O)O)[C@@]([C@@H]1CCC(C)C(/C(=C/CC(/C=C/C(C)C(/C=C/CC(/C(=C/CC(CC3CCCN3C(=N)N)O)/C)O)O)O)/C)O)(C)/C(=C\4/C(=O)CNC4=O)/O

Properties
Chemical formula	C_{47}H_{74}N_{4}O_{10}
Molar mass	855.127 g·mol^{−1}
- Except where otherwise noted, data are given for materials in their standard state (at 25 °C [77 °F], 100 kPa). Infobox references

Lydicamycin is an organic compound with the molecular formula C_{47}H_{74}N_{4}O_{10}. Lydicamycin is an antibiotic with activity against Gram-positive bacteria. The bacteria Streptomyces lydicamycinicus and Streptomyces platensis produces lydicamycin.
