= Streptomyces bungoensis =

Scientific classification
- Domain: Bacteria
- Kingdom: Bacillati
- Phylum: Actinomycetota
- Class: Actinomycetia
- Order: Streptomycetales
- Family: Streptomycetaceae
- Genus: Streptomyces
- Species: S. bungoensis

Binomial name
- Streptomyces bungoensis Eguchi et al. 1993

Type strain
- AS 4.1653, BCRC 16850, CCRC 16850, CGMCC 4.1653, DSM 41781, FERM 8432, IFO 15711, JCM 9925, MS16-10G, NBRC 15711

Species of bacterium

Streptomyces bungoensis is a bacterium species from the genus of Streptomyces which was isolated from soil from Japan. A P450 from Streptomyces bungoensis has been used to convert pladienolide B to pladienolide D.

== See also ==
- List of Streptomyces species
