= Macroketone =

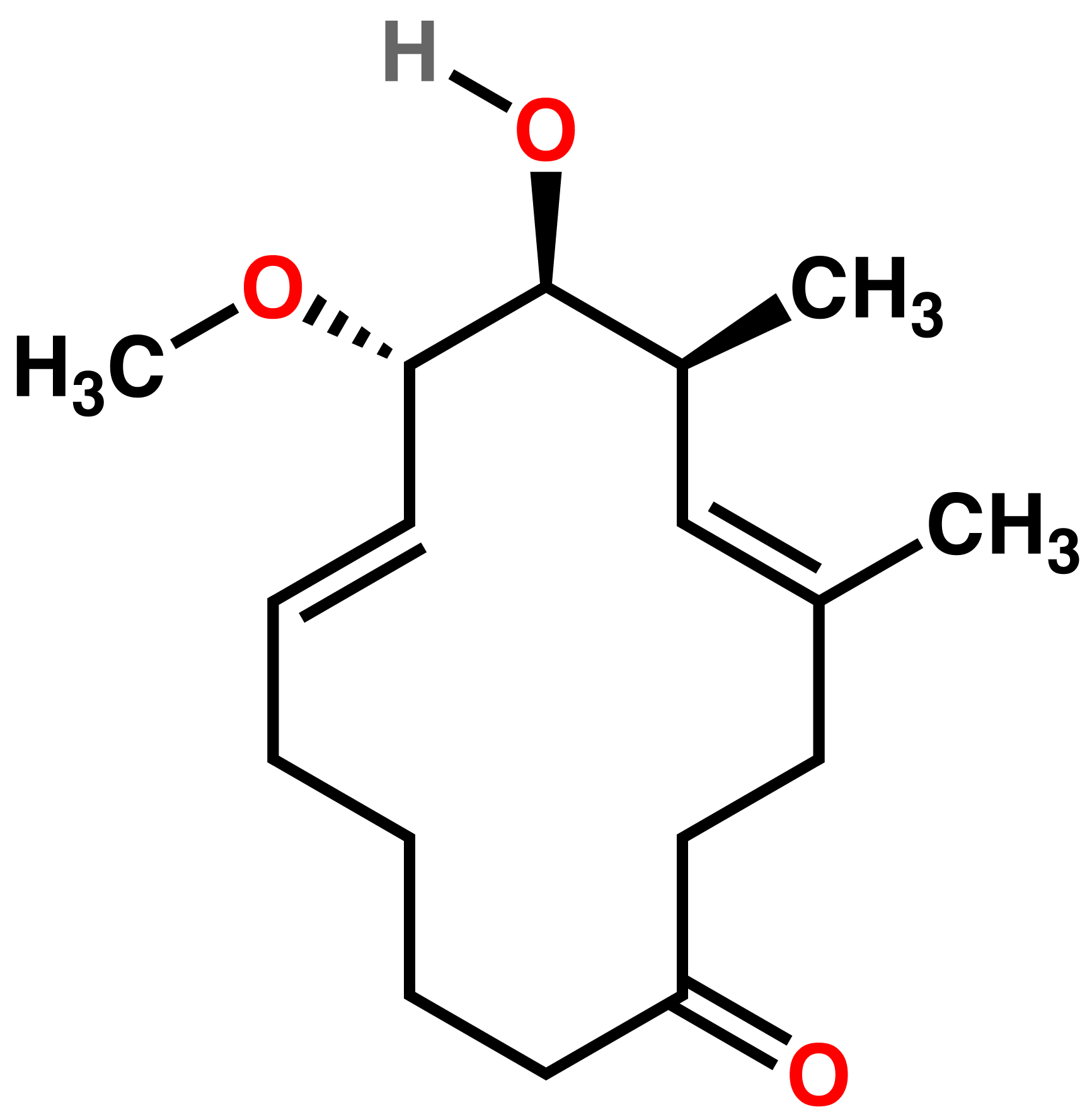
Chemical structure of (4E,6S,7S,8S,9E)-7-hydroxy-8-methoxy-4,6-dimethylcyclotetradeca-4,9-dien-1-one, a macroketone used in the synthesis of migrastatin analogs

Macroketones are macrocyclic compounds that contain a ketone functional group. Macroketones form the central rings systems of some synthetic polyketide antibiotics.
