= Pladienolide B =

Names
- IUPAC name [(2S,3S,4E,6S,7R,10R)-7,10-dihydroxy-2-[(2E,4E,6S)-7-[(2R,3R)-3-[(2R,3S)-3-hydroxypentan-2-yl]oxiran-2-yl]-6-methylhepta-2,4-dien-2-yl]-3,7-dimethyl-12-oxo-1-oxacyclododec-4-en-6-yl] acetate

Identifiers
| CAS Number | 445493-23-2 |
| 3D model (JSmol) | Interactive image |
| ChemSpider | 17330476 |
| PubChem CID | 16202130 |
| CompTox Dashboard (EPA) | DTXSID701098499 |
- InChI: InChI=1S/C30H48O8/c1-8-24(33)21(5)29-25(37-29)16-18(2)10-9-11-19(3)28-20(4)12-13-26(36-22(6)31)30(7,35)15-14-23(32)17-27(34)38-28/h9-13,18,20-21,23-26,28-29,32-33,35H,8,14-17H2,1-7H3/b10-9+,13-12+,19-11+/t18-,20+,21-,23-,24+,25-,26+,28-,29-,30-/m1/s1 Key: SDOUORKJIJYJNW-QHOUZYGJSA-N
- SMILES: CC[C@@H]([C@@H](C)[C@@H]1[C@H](O1)C[C@H](C)/C=C/C=C(\C)/[C@@H]2[C@H](/C=C/[C@@H]([C@](CC[C@H](CC(=O)O2)O)(C)O)OC(=O)C)C)O

Properties
| Chemical formula | C_{30}H_{48}O_{8} |
| Molar mass | 536.706 g·mol^{−1} |
- Except where otherwise noted, data are given for materials in their standard state (at 25 °C [77 °F], 100 kPa). Infobox references

Pladienolide B is a polyketide natural product that is made by the bacterium Streptomyces platensis MER-11107, which is a gram-positive bacteria isolated from soil in Japan. Pladienolide B is a molecule of interest due to potential anti-cancer properties. The proposed mechanism of action of this molecule is via binding to and inhibiting the SF3B complex within the human spliceosome.

== Biosynthesis ==
As a polyketide, pladienolide B is synthesized in the polyketide synthase (PKS) type I pathway, a biosynthetic pathway that is derived from the fatty acid synthase (FAS) pathway. Polyketides are formed through the condensation of acyl-thioester units. The synthesis of pladienolide B begins with acyl transferase loading propionyl CoA onto the holo (activated) acyl carrier protein (ACP). The molecule is then extended ten times, each time by two carbon units, by iterative PKS (Figure 1). Figure 1 indicates the loading unit (malonyl CoA or methylmalonyl CoA) and tailoring enzymes for each module (turquoise enzyme clusters in part c of Figure 1). After the ten elongation modules, the active site serine residue of thioesterase (TE) acts as a nucleophile by attacking the ketone directly bound to CoA-SH. This nucleophilic attack causes CoA-SH to leave and thus transfers the elongated chain to TE. Then the hydroxyl group on carbon 11 acts as a nucleophile by attacking the terminal ketone so that carbons 1-11 form a cyclic, 12-membered ring, releasing TE in the process. This concludes the PKS portion of the biosynthesis, and thus results in the pladienolide B backbone structure.

Post-PKS modifications: Acetyl-transferase (AT) transfers an acetyl group to carbon 7. The following step is either that a P450 I enzyme (PldB C6-hydroxylase) adds a hydroxyl group on carbon 6, and/or that an epoxide group is added between carbons 18 and 19 by P450 II (PldD C18-C19-epoxidase). Based on the purification results of these post-PKS compounds by Boothe et al., it seems that either hydroxylation or acetylation could occur first, but Boothe et al. found a that hydroxylation seems to occur first more than twice as often as acetylation occurs first. However, regardless of hydroxylation or acetylation occurring first, the result of these tailoring steps yields pladienolide B (Figure 1).

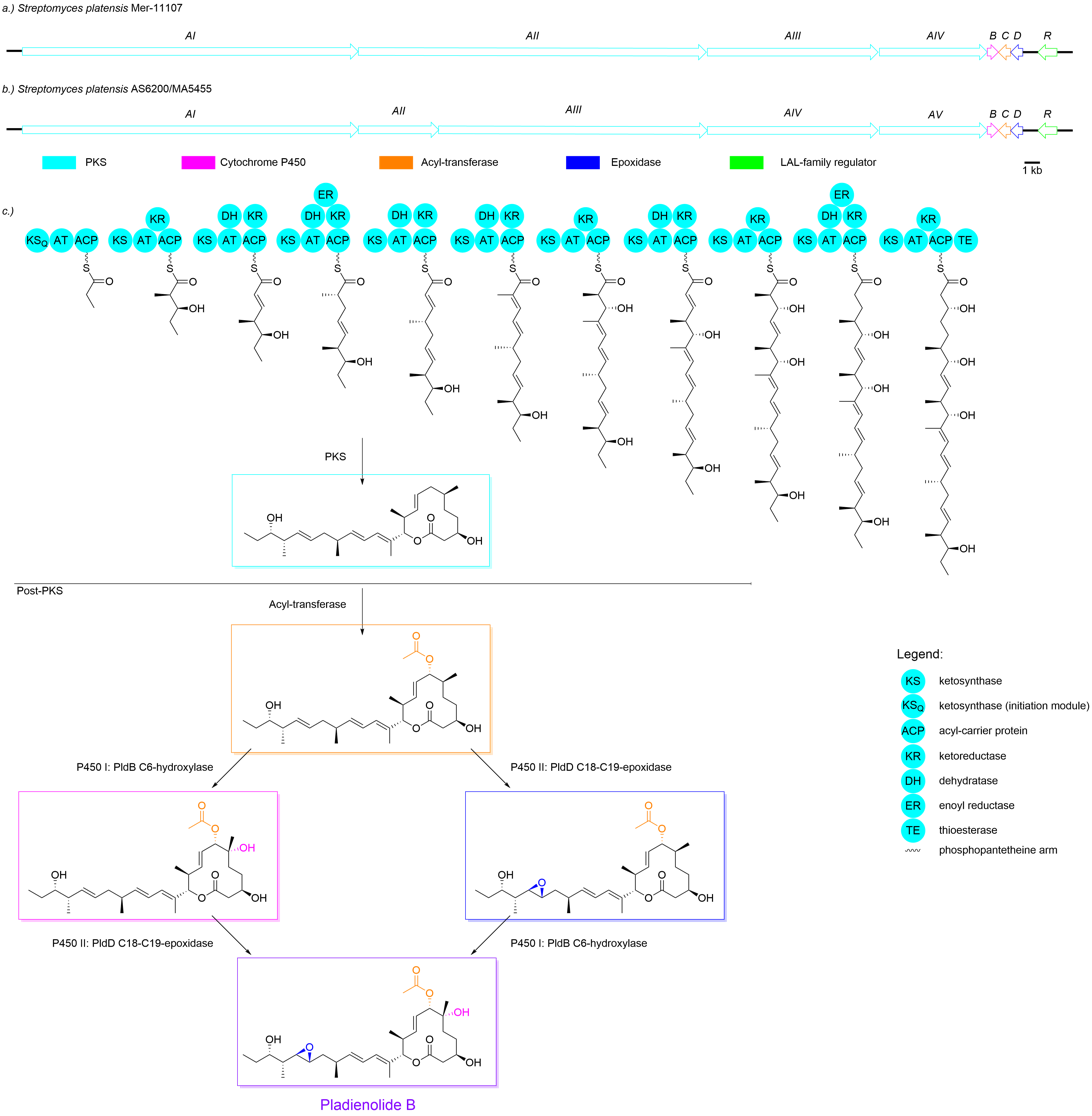
Figure 1: Gene clusters (a) S. platensis Mer-11107 and (b) S. platensis AS6200/MA5455; and pladienolide B biosynthesis with tailoring and post-PKS modifications.

Carbons are numbered using the traditional IUPAC naming system in which C1 is the ketone carbon in the ring, and C23 is the terminal carbon on the chain.
