= Streptomyces pluricolorescens =

Scientific classification
- Domain: Bacteria
- Kingdom: Bacillati
- Phylum: Actinomycetota
- Class: Actinomycetia
- Order: Streptomycetales
- Family: Streptomycetaceae
- Genus: Streptomyces
- Species: S. pluricolorescens

Binomial name
- Streptomyces pluricolorescens Okami and Umezawa 1961

Type strain
- 91-T1-1, ATCC 197, ATCC 19798, BCRC 13657, CBS 550.68, CCRC 13657, CUB 141, DSM 40019, ETH 24329, IFM 1101, IFO 12808, ISP 5019, JCM 4302, JCM 4602, KCC S-0302, KCC S-0602, KCCS-0302, KCCS-0602, LMG 8576, NBRC 12808, NCIB 9813, NCIMB 9813, NIHJ 238, NRRL B-2121, NRRL-ISP 5019, RIA 1077, UNIQEM 184, VKM Ac-765

Species of bacterium

Streptomyces pluricolorescens is a bacterium species from the genus of Streptomyces which has been isolated from soil in Japan. Streptomyces pluricolorescens produces chrothiomycin, pluramycin A and pluramycin B.

== See also ==
- List of Streptomyces species
