= Streptomyces lydicamycinicus =

Scientific classification
- Domain: Bacteria
- Kingdom: Bacillati
- Phylum: Actinomycetota
- Class: Actinomycetes
- Order: Streptomycetales
- Family: Streptomycetaceae
- Genus: Streptomyces
- Species: S. lydicamycinicus

Binomial name
- Streptomyces lydicamycinicus Komaki et al. 2020

Type strain
- TP-A0598

Species of bacterium

Streptomyces lydicamycinicus is a bacterium species from the genus of Streptomyces. Streptomyces lydicamycinicus produces the antibiotic lydicamycin.

== See also ==
- List of Streptomyces species
