= Type III secretion system =

Bacterial virulence factor

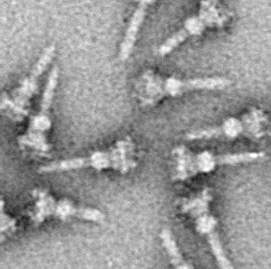
A transmission electron microscope image of isolated T3SS needle complexes from Salmonella Typhimurium

The type III secretion system (T3SS or TTSS) is one of the bacterial secretion systems used by bacteria to secrete their effector proteins into host cells to promote virulence and colonisation. While the type III secretion system has been widely regarded as equivalent to the injectisome, many argue that the injectisome is only part of the type III secretion system, which also include structures like the flagellar export apparatus. The T3SS is a needle-like protein complex found in several species of pathogenic gram-negative bacteria.

== Overview ==
The term 'Type III secretion system' was coined in 1993. This secretion system is distinguished from at least five other secretion systems found in gram-negative bacteria. Many animal and plant associated bacteria possess similar T3SSs. These T3SSs are similar as a result of convergent evolution and phylogenetic analysis supports a model in which gram-negative bacteria can transfer the T3SS gene cassette horizontally to other species. Some of the most researched T3SSs are from species of:

- Shigella (causes bacillary dysentery),
- Salmonella (typhoid fever),
- Escherichia coli (Gut flora, some strains cause food poisoning),
- Vibrio (gastroenteritis and diarrhea),
- Burkholderia (glanders),
- Yersinia (plague),
- Chlamydia (sexually transmitted disease),
- Pseudomonas (infects humans, animals and plants) and the
- Plant pathogens such as Erwinia, Ralstonia and Xanthomonas, and the plant symbiont Rhizobium.

The T3SS is composed of approximately 30 different proteins, making it one of the most complex secretion systems. Its structure shows many similarities with bacterial flagella (long, rigid, extracellular structures used for motility). Some of the proteins participating in T3SS share amino-acid sequence homology to flagellar proteins. Some of the bacteria possessing a T3SS have flagella as well and are motile (Salmonella, for instance), and some do not (Shigella, for instance). Technically speaking, type III secretion is used both for secreting infection-related proteins and flagellar components. However, the term "type III secretion" is used mainly in relation to the infection apparatus. The bacterial flagellum shares a common ancestor with the type III secretion system.

T3SSs are essential for the pathogenicity (the ability to infect) of many pathogenic bacteria. Defects in the T3SS may render a bacterium non-pathogenic. It has been suggested that some non-invasive strains of gram-negative bacteria have lost the T3SS because the energetically costly system is no longer of use. Although traditional antibiotics were effective against these bacteria in the past, antibiotic-resistant strains constantly emerge. Understanding the way the T3SS works and developing drugs targeting it specifically have become an important goal of many research groups around the world since the late 1990s.

== Structure ==
Type III secretion system
- The T3SS needle complex

Identifiers
- Symbol: T3SS
- TCDB: 1.B.22
- OPM superfamily: 348
- OPM protein: 5tcq

The hallmark of T3SS is the needle (more generally, the needle complex (NC) or the T3SS apparatus (T3SA); also called injectisome when the ATPase is excluded; see below). Bacterial proteins that need to be secreted pass from the bacterial cytoplasm through the needle directly into the host cytoplasm. Three membranes separate the two cytoplasms: the double membranes (inner and outer membranes) of the Gram-negative bacterium and the eukaryotic membrane. The needle provides a smooth passage through those highly selective and almost impermeable membranes. A single bacterium can have several hundred needle complexes spread across its membrane. It has been proposed that the needle complex is a universal feature of all T3SSs of pathogenic bacteria.

The needle complex starts at the cytoplasm of the bacterium, crosses the two membranes and protrudes from the cell. The part anchored in the membrane is the base (or basal body) of the T3SS. The extracellular part is the needle. A so-called inner rod connects the needle to the base. The needle itself, although the biggest and most prominent part of the T3SS, is made out of many units of a single protein. The majority of the different T3SS proteins are therefore those that build the base and those that are secreted into the host. As mentioned above, the needle complex shares similarities with bacterial flagella. More specifically, the base of the needle complex is structurally very similar to the flagellar base; the needle itself is analogous to the flagellar hook, a structure connecting the base to the flagellar filament.

The base is composed of several circular rings and is the first structure that is built in a new needle complex. Once the base is completed, it serves as a secretion machine for the outer proteins (the needle). Once the whole complex is completed the system switches to secreting proteins that are intended to be delivered into host cells. The needle is presumed to be built from bottom to top; units of needle monomer protein pile upon each other, so that the unit at the tip of the needle is the last one added. The needle subunit is one of the smallest T3SS proteins, measuring at around 9 kDa. 100−150 subunits comprise each needle.

The T3SS needle measures around 60−80 nm in length and 8 nm in external width. It needs to have a minimal length so that other extracellular bacterial structures (adhesins and the lipopolysaccharide layer, for instance) do not interfere with secretion. The hole of the needle has a 3 nm diameter. Most folded effector proteins are too large to pass through the needle opening, so most secreted proteins must pass through the needle unfolded, a task carried out by the ATPase at the base of the structure.

== T3SS proteins ==
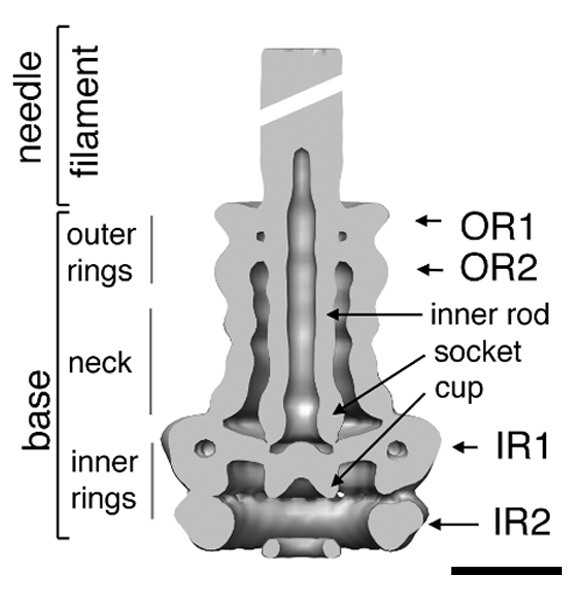
Diagram of individual substructures of the needle complex from Salmonella typhimurium

The T3SS proteins can be grouped into three categories:

- Structural proteins: build the base, the inner rod and the needle.
- Effector proteins: get secreted into the host cell and promote infection / suppress host cell defences.
- Chaperones: bind effectors in the bacterial cytoplasm, protect them from aggregation and degradation and direct them towards the needle complex.

Most T3SS genes are laid out in operons. These operons are located on the bacterial chromosome in some species and on a dedicated plasmid in other species. Salmonella, for instance, has a chromosomal region in which most T3SS genes are gathered, the so-called Salmonella pathogenicity island (SPI). Shigella, on the other hand, has a large virulence plasmid on which all T3SS genes reside. Many pathogenicity islands and plasmids contain elements that allow for frequent horizontal gene transfer of the island/plasmid to a new species.

Effector proteins that are to be secreted through the needle need to be recognized by the system, since they float in the cytoplasm together with thousands of other proteins. Recognition is done through a secretion signal—a short sequence of amino acids located at the beginning (the N-terminus) of the protein (usually within the first 20 amino acids), that the needle complex is able to recognize. Unlike other secretion systems, the secretion signal of T3SS proteins is never cleaved off the protein.

== Induction of secretion ==
Contact of the needle with a host cell triggers the T3SS to start secreting; not much is known about this trigger mechanism (see below). Secretion can also be induced by lowering the concentration of calcium ions in the growth medium (for Yersinia and Pseudomonas; done by adding a chelator such as EDTA or EGTA) and by adding the aromatic dye Congo red to the growth medium (for Shigella), for instance. These methods and other are used in laboratories to artificially induce type III secretion.

Induction of secretion by external cues other than contact with host cells also takes place in vivo, in infected organisms. The bacteria sense such cues as temperature, pH, osmolarity and oxygen levels, and use them to "decide" whether to activate their T3SS. For instance, Salmonella can replicate and invade better in the ileum rather than in the cecum of animal intestine. The bacteria are able to know where they are thanks to the different ions present in these regions; the ileum contains formate and acetate, while the cecum does not. The bacteria sense these molecules, determine that they are at the ileum and activate their secretion machinery. Molecules present in the cecum, such as propionate and butyrate, provide a negative cue to the bacteria and inhibit secretion. Cholesterol, a lipid found in most eukaryotic cell membranes, is able to induce secretion in Shigella.

The external cues listed above either regulate secretion directly or through a genetic mechanism. Several transcription factors that regulate the expression of T3SS genes are known. Some of the chaperones that bind T3SS effectors also act as transcription factors. A feedback mechanism has been suggested: when the bacterium does not secrete, its effector proteins are bound to chaperones and float in the cytoplasm. When secretion starts, the chaperones detach from the effectors and the latter are secreted and leave the cell. The lone chaperones then act as transcription factors, binding to the genes encoding their effectors and inducing their transcription and thereby the production of more effectors.

Structures similar to Type3SS injectisomes have been proposed to rivet gram negative bacterial outer and inner membranes to help release outer membrane vesicles targeted to deliver bacterial secretions to eukaryotic host or other target cells in vivo.

== T3SS-mediated infection ==
T3SS effectors enter the needle complex at the base and make their way inside the needle towards the host cell. The exact way in which effectors enter the host is mostly unknown. It has been previously suggested that the needle itself is capable of puncturing a hole in the host cell membrane; this theory has been refuted. It is now clear that some effectors, collectively named translocators, are secreted first and produce a pore or a channel (a translocon) in the host cell membrane, through which other effectors may enter. Mutated bacteria that lack translocators are able to secrete proteins but are not able to deliver them into host cells. In general each T3SS includes three translocators. Some translocators serve a double role; after they participate in pore formation they enter the cell and act as bona fide effectors.

T3SS effectors manipulate host cells in several ways. The most striking effect is the promoting of uptake of the bacterium by the host cell. Many bacteria possessing T3SSs must enter host cells in order to replicate and propagate infection. The effectors they inject into the host cell induce the host to engulf the bacterium and to practically "eat" it. In order for this to happen the bacterial effectors manipulate the actin polymerization machinery of the host cell. Actin is a component of the cytoskeleton and it also participates in motility and in changes in cell shape. Through its T3SS effectors the bacterium is able to utilize the host cell's own machinery for its own benefit. Once the bacterium has entered the cell it is able to secrete other effectors more easily and it can penetrate neighboring cells and quickly infect the whole tissue.

T3SS effectors have also been shown to tamper with the host's cell cycle and some of them are able to induce apoptosis. One of the most researched T3SS effector is IpaB from Shigella flexneri. It serves a double role, both as a translocator, creating a pore in the host cell membrane, and as an effector, exerting multiple detrimental effects on the host cell. It had been demonstrated that IpaB induces apoptosis in macrophages—cells of the animal immune system—after being engulfed by them. It was later shown that IpaB achieves this by interacting with caspase 1, a major regulatory protein in eukaryotic cells.

Another well characterized class of T3SS effectors are Transcription Activator-like effectors (TAL effectors) from Xanthomonas. When injected into plants, these proteins can enter the nucleus of the plant cell, bind plant promoter sequences, and activate transcription of plant genes that aid in bacterial infection. TAL effector-DNA recognition has recently been demonstrated to comprise a simple code and this has greatly improved the understanding of how these proteins can alter the transcription of genes in the host plant cells.

== Unresolved issues ==
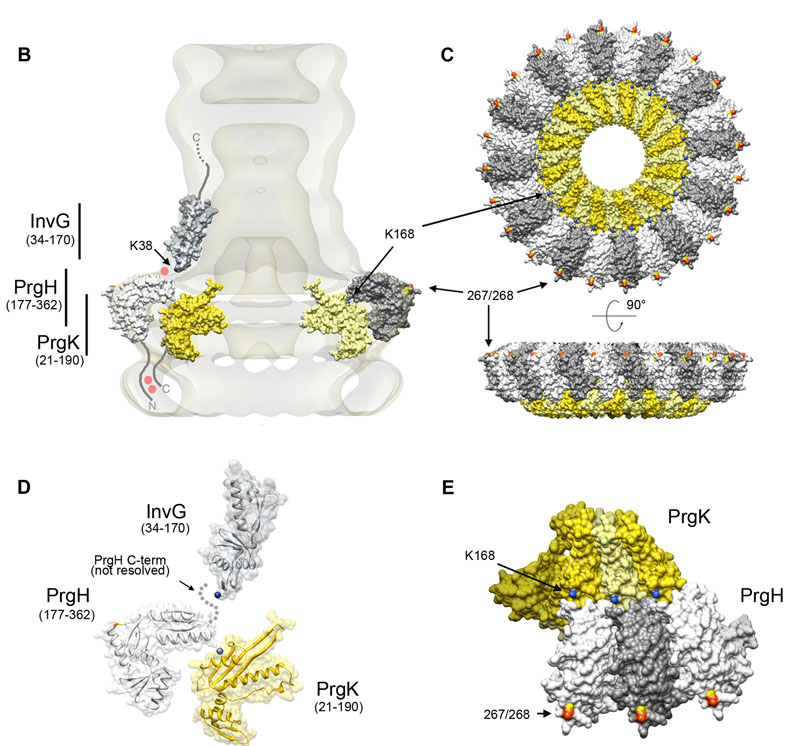
The topology and organization of the Salmonella needle complex.

Hundreds of articles on T3SS have been published since the mid-nineties. However, numerous issues regarding the system remain unresolved:

- T3SS proteins. Of the approximately 30 T3SS proteins less than 10 in each organism have been directly detected using biochemical methods. The rest, being perhaps rare, have proven difficult to detect and they remain theoretical (although genetic rather than biochemical studies have been performed on many T3SS genes/proteins). The localization of each protein is also not entirely known.
- The length of the needle. It is not known how the bacterium "knows" when a new needle has reached its proper length. Several theories exist, among them the existence of a "ruler protein" that somehow connects the tip and the base of the needle. Addition of new monomers to the tip of the needle should stretch the ruler protein and thereby signal the needle length to the base.
- Energetics. The force that drives the passage of proteins inside the needle is not completely known. An ATPase is associated with the base of the T3SS and participates in directing proteins into the needle; but whether it supplies the energy for transport is not clear.
- Secretion signal. As mentioned above, the existence of a secretion signal in effector proteins is known. The signal allows the system to distinguish T3SS-transported proteins from any other protein. Its nature, requirements and the mechanism of recognition are poorly understood, but methods for predicting which bacterial proteins can be transported by the Type III secretion system have recently been developed.
- Activation of secretion. The bacterium must know when the time is right to secrete effectors. Unnecessary secretion, when no host cell is in vicinity, is wasteful for the bacterium in terms of energy and resources. The bacterium is somehow able to recognize contact of the needle with the host cell. How this is done is still being researched, and the method may well be dependent on the pathogen. Some theories postulate a delicate conformational change in the structure of the needle upon contact with the host cell; this change perhaps serves as a signal for the base to commence secretion. One method of recognition has been discovered in Salmonella, which relies on sensing host cell cytosolic pH through the pathogenicity island 2-encoded T3SS in order to switch on secretion of effectors.
- Binding of chaperones. It is not known when chaperones bind their effectors (whether during or after translation) and how they dissociate from their effectors before secretion.
- Effector mechanisms. Although much was revealed since the beginning of the 21st century about the ways in which T3SS effectors manipulate the host, the majority of effects and pathways remains unknown.
- Evolution. As mentioned, the T3SS is closely related to the bacterial flagellum. There are three competing hypotheses: first, that the flagellum evolved first and the T3SS is derived from that structure, second, that the T3SS evolved first and the flagellum is derived from it, and third, that the two structures are derived from a common ancestor. There was some controversy about the different scenarios, since they all explain protein homology between the two structures, as well as their functional diversity. Yet, recent phylogenomic evidence favours the hypothesis that the T3SS derived from the flagellum by a process involving initial gene loss and then gene acquisition. A key step of the latter process was the recruitment of secretins to the T3SS, an event that occurred at least three times from other membrane-associated systems.

== Nomenclature of T3SS proteins ==
Flagellum of Gram-negative bacteria. The rings of the base are very similar to needle-complex rings, although the existence of a C-ring in the needle complex has not been proven. The flagellar hook is homologous to the T3SS needle

Since the beginning of the 1990s new T3SS proteins are being found in different bacterial species at a steady rate. Abbreviations have been given independently for each series of proteins in each organism, and the names usually do not reveal much about the protein's function. Some proteins discovered independently in different bacteria have later been shown to be homologous; the historical names, however, have mostly been kept, a fact that might cause confusion. For example, the proteins SicA, IpgC and SycD are homologs from Salmonella, Shigella and Yersinia, respectively, but the last letter (the "serial number") in their name does not show that.

Below is a summary of the most common protein-series names in several T3SS-containing species. Note that these names include proteins that form the T3SS machinery as well as the secreted effector proteins:

- Yersinia
  - Yop: Yersinia outer protein
  - Ysc: Yersinia secretion (component)
  - Ypk: Yersinia protein kinase
- Salmonella
  - Spa: Surface presentation of antigen
  - Sic: Salmonella invasion chaperone
  - Sip: Salmonella invasion protein
  - Prg: PhoP-repressed gene
  - Inv: Invasion
  - Org: Oxygen-regulated gene
  - Ssp: Salmonella-secreted protein
  - Iag: Invasion-associated gene
- Shigella
  - Ipg: Invasion plasmid gene
  - Ipa: Invasion plasmid antigen
  - Mxi: Membrane expression of Ipa
  - Spa: Surface presentation of antigen
  - Osp: Outer Shigella protein
- Escherichia
  - Tir: Translocated intimin receptor
  - Sep: Secretion of E. coli proteins
  - Esc: Escherichia secretion (component)
  - Esp: Escherichia secretion protein
  - Ces: Chaperone of E. coli secretion
- Pseudomonas
  - Hrp: Hypersensitive response and pathogenicity
  - Hrc: Hypersensitive response conserved (or Hrp conserved)
- Rhizobium
  - Nop: Nodulation protein
  - Rhc: Rhizobium conserved
- In several species:
  - Vir: Virulence
- "Protochlamydia amoebophila"
- "Sodalis glossinidius"

Following those abbreviations is a letter or a number. Letters usually denote a "serial number", either the chronological order of discovery or the physical order of appearance of the gene in an operon. Numbers, the rarer case, denote the molecular weight of the protein in kDa. Examples: IpaA, IpaB, IpaC; MxiH, MxiG, MxiM; Spa9, Spa47.

Several key elements appear in all T3SSs: the needle monomer, the inner rod of the needle, the ring proteins, the two translocators, the needle-tip protein, the ruler protein (which is thought to determine the needle's length; see above) and the ATPase, which supplies energy for secretion. The following table shows some of these key proteins in four T3SS-containing bacteria:

↓ Function / Genus →	Shigella	Salmonella	Yersinia	Escherichia
Needle monomer	MxiH	PrgI	YscF	EscF
Inner rod	MxiI	PrgJ	YscI	EscI
Needle-tip protein	IpaD	SipD	LcrV	EspA
Translocator	IpaB	SipB	YopB	EspD
Translocator	IpaC	SipC	YopD	EspB
Chaperone for the two translocators	IpgC	SicA	SycD	CesD
ATPase	Spa47	InvC	YscN	SepB (EscN)
Ruler protein	Spa32	InvJ	YscP	Orf16
Switch	Spa40	SpaS	YscU	EscU
Gatekeeper	MxiC	InvE	YopN (TyeA)	SepL

== Methods employed in T3SS research ==
=== Isolation of T3SS needle complexes ===
The isolation of large, fragile, hydrophobic membrane structures from cells has constituted a challenge for many years. By the end of the 1990s, however, several approaches have been developed for the isolation of T3SS NCs. In 1998 the first NCs were isolated from Salmonella typhimurium.

For the isolation, bacteria are grown in a large volume of liquid growth medium until they reach log phase. They are then centrifuged; the supernatant (the medium) is discarded and the pellet (the bacteria) is resuspended in a lysis buffer typically containing lysozyme and sometimes a detergent such as LDAO or Triton X-100. This buffer disintegrates the cell wall. After several rounds of lysis and washing, the opened bacteria are subjected to a series of ultracentrifugations. This treatment enriches large macromolecular structures and discards smaller cell components. Optionally, the final lysate is subjected to further purification by CsCl density gradient.

An additional approach for further purification uses affinity chromatography. Recombinant T3SS proteins that carry a protein tag (a histidine tag, for instance) are produced by molecular cloning and then introduced (transformed) into the researched bacteria. After initial NC isolation, as described above, the lysate is passed through a column coated with particles with high affinity to the tag (in the case of histidine tags: nickel ions). The tagged protein is retained in the column, and with it the entire needle complex. High degrees of purity can be achieved using such methods. This purity is essential for many delicate assays that have been used for NC characterization.

Type III effectors were known since the beginning of the 1990s, but the way in which they are delivered into host cells was a complete mystery. The homology between many flagellar and T3SS proteins led researchers to suspects the existence of an outer T3SS structure similar to flagella. The identification and subsequent isolation of the needle structure enabled researchers to:

- characterize the three-dimensional structure of the NC in detail, and through this to draw conclusions regarding the mechanism of secretion (for example, that the narrow width of the needle requires unfolding of effectors prior to secretion),
- analyze the protein components of the NC, this by subjecting isolated needles to proteomic analysis (see below),
- assign roles to various NC components, this by knocking out T3SS genes, isolating NCs from the mutated bacteria and examining the changes that the mutations caused.

=== Microscopy, crystallography and solid-state NMR ===
As with almost all proteins, the visualization of T3SS NCs is only possible with electron microscopy. The first images of NCs (1998) showed needle structures protruding from the cell wall of live bacteria and flat, two-dimensional isolated NCs. In 2001 images of NCs from Shigella flexneri were digitally analyzed and averaged to obtain a first semi-3D structure of the NC. The helical structure of NCs from Shigella flexneri was resolved at a resolution of 16 Å using X-ray fiber diffraction in 2003, and a year later a 17-Å 3D structure of NCs from Salmonella typhimurium was published. Recent advances and approaches have allowed high-resolution 3D images of the NC, further clarifying the complex structure of the NC.

Numerous T3SS proteins have been crystallized over the years. These include structural proteins of the NC, effectors and chaperones. The first structure of a needle-complex monomer was NMR structure of BsaL from "Burkholderia pseudomallei" and later the crystal structure of MixH from Shigella flexneri, which were both resolved in 2006.

In 2012, a combination of recombinant wild-type needle production, solid-state NMR, electron microscopy and Rosetta modeling revealed the supramolecular interfaces and ultimately the complete atomic structure of the Salmonella typhimurium T3SS needle. It was shown that the 80-residue PrgI subunits form a right-handed helical assembly with roughly 11 subunits per two turns, similar to that of the flagellum of Salmonella typhimurium. The model also revealed an extended amino-terminal domain that is positioned on the surface of the needle, while the highly conserved carboxy terminus points towards the lumen.

=== Proteomics ===
Several methods have been employed in order to identify the array of proteins that comprise the T3SS. Isolated needle complexes can be separated with SDS-PAGE. The bands that appear after staining can be individually excised from the gel and analyzed using protein sequencing and mass spectrometry. The structural components of the NC can be separated from each other (the needle part from the base part, for instance), and by analyzing those fractions the proteins participating in each one can be deduced. Alternatively, isolated NCs can be directly analyzed by mass spectrometry, without prior electrophoresis, in order to obtain a complete picture of the NC proteome.

=== Genetic and functional studies ===
The T3SS in many bacteria has been manipulated by researchers. Observing the influence of individual manipulations can be used to draw insights into the role of each component of the system. Examples of manipulations are:

- Deletion of one or more T3SS genes (gene knockout).
- Overexpression of one or more T3SS genes (in other words: production in vivo of a T3SS protein in quantities larger than usual).
- Point or regional changes in T3SS genes or proteins. This is done in order to define the function of specific amino acids or regions in a protein.
- The introduction of a gene or a protein from one species of bacteria into another (cross-complementation assay). This is done in order to check for differences and similarities between two T3SSs.

Manipulation of T3SS components can have influence on several aspects of bacterial function and pathogenicity. Examples of possible influences:

- The ability of the bacteria to invade host cells, in the case of intracellular pathogens. This can be measured using an invasion assay (gentamicin protection assay).
- The ability of intracellular bacteria to migrate between host cells.
- The ability of the bacteria to kill host cells. This can be measured by several methods, for instance by the LDH-release assay, in which the enzyme LDH, which leaks from dead cells, is identified by measuring its enzymatic activity.
- The ability of a T3SS to secrete a specific protein or to secrete at all. In order to assay this, secretion is induced in bacteria growing in liquid medium. The bacteria and medium are then separated by centrifugation, and the medium fraction (the supernatant) is then assayed for the presence of secreted proteins. In order to prevent a normally secreted protein from being secreted, a large molecule can be artificially attached to it. If the then non-secreted protein stays "stuck" at the bottom of the needle complex, the secretion is effectively blocked.
- The ability of the bacteria to assemble an intact needle complex. NCs can be isolated from manipulated bacteria and examined microscopically. Minor changes, however cannot always be detected by microscopy.
- The ability of bacteria to infect live animals or plants. Even if manipulated bacteria are shown in vitro to be able to infect host cells, their ability to sustain an infection in a live organism cannot be taken for granted.
- The expression levels of other genes. This can be assayed in several ways, notably northern blot and RT-PCR. The expression levels of the entire genome can be assayed by microarray. Many type III transcription factors and regulatory networks were discovered using these methods.
- The growth and fitness of bacteria.

=== Inhibitors of the T3SS ===
A few compounds have been discovered that inhibit the T3SS in gram-negative bacteria, including the guadinomines which are naturally produced by Streptomyces species. Monoclonal antibodies have been developed that inhibit the T3SS too. Aurodox, an antibiotic capable of inhibiting the translation of T3SS proteins has been shown to able to prevent T3SS effectors in vitro and in animal models

== Type III signal peptide prediction tools ==
- EffectiveT3
