= Niphimycin =

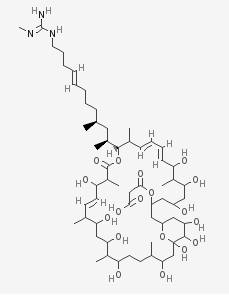

Identifiers
| CAS Number | 12676-71-0 |
| 3D model (JSmol) | Interactive image |
| ChEMBL | ChEMBL413402 |
| ChemSpider | 23268137 |
| PubChem CID | 44409344 |
| UNII | EM4PN7FVB8 |
- InChI: InChI=1S/C59H103N3O18/c1-34(18-14-12-10-11-13-17-25-62-58(60)61-9)26-38(5)55-37(4)19-15-16-20-45(64)39(6)49(68)28-42(63)27-43(78-54(74)32-53(72)73)29-44-30-51(70)56(75)59(77,80-44)33-52(71)36(3)22-23-46(65)40(7)50(69)31-48(67)35(2)21-24-47(66)41(8)57(76)79-55/h10-11,15-16,19-21,24,34-52,55-56,63-71,75,77H,12-14,17-18,22-23,25-33H2,1-9H3,(H,72,73)(H3,60,61,62)/b11-10+,19-15+,20-16+,24-21+/t34-,35?,36?,37?,38-,39?,40?,41?,42?,43?,44?,45?,46?,47?,48?,49?,50?,51?,52?,55-,56?,59?/m0/s1 Key: VAYOSPAPALLOIO-WBWCZIISSA-N
- SMILES: CC1CCC(C(C(CC(C(/C=C/C(C(C(=O)O[C@@H](C(/C=C/C=C/C(C(C(CC(CC(CC2CC(C(C(O2)(CC1O)O)O)O)OC(=O)CC(=O)O)O)O)C)O)C)[C@@H](C)C[C@@H](C)CCC/C=C/CCCNC(=NC)N)C)O)C)O)O)C)O

Properties
| Chemical formula | C_{59}H_{103}N_{3}O_{18} |
| Molar mass | 1142.476 g·mol^{−1} |
- Except where otherwise noted, data are given for materials in their standard state (at 25 °C [77 °F], 100 kPa). Infobox references

Niphimycin is an antimicrobial made by Streptomyces.
