= Spenolimycin =

Names
- IUPAC name (1R,3S,5R,8S,10R,11S,12S,13R,14S)-7-methoxy-5-methyl-11,13-bis(methylamino)-2,4,9-trioxatricyclo[8.4.0.03,8]tetradec-6-ene-8,12,14-triol

Identifiers
CAS Number	95041-97-7
3D model (JSmol)	Interactive image
ChEBI	CHEBI:81421
ChemSpider	111484
KEGG	C17970
PubChem CID	125257
CompTox Dashboard (EPA)	DTXSID60241735
- InChI: InChI=1S/C15H26N2O7/c1-6-5-7(21-4)15(20)14(22-6)23-13-11(19)8(16-2)10(18)9(17-3)12(13)24-15/h5-6,8-14,16-20H,1-4H3/t6-,8-,9+,10+,11+,12-,13-,14+,15+/m1/s1 Key: JXUOVTMVWNHOAJ-XLBYJKOOSA-N
- SMILES: C[C@@H]1C=C([C@]2([C@@H](O1)O[C@@H]3[C@H]([C@@H]([C@@H]([C@@H]([C@H]3O2)NC)O)NC)O)O)OC

Properties
Chemical formula	C_{15}H_{26}N_{2}O_{7}
Molar mass	346.380 g·mol^{−1}
Solubility in water	Soluble
- Except where otherwise noted, data are given for materials in their standard state (at 25 °C [77 °F], 100 kPa). Infobox references

Spenolimycin is a spectinomycin-type antibiotic which has been isolated from the bacterium Streptomyces gilvospiralissp. Spenolimycin has the molecular formula C_{15}H_{26}N_{2}O_{7}.
