= Kettapeptin =

Identifiers
CAS Number	1104900-41-5
3D model (JSmol)	Interactive image
ChemSpider	9796916
PubChem CID	102513837
- InChI: InChI=1S/C48H78N8O15/c1-13-26(5)37(58)28(7)23-29(8)39-27(6)19-20-48(67,71-39)47(66,14-2)46(65)52-36-38(25(3)4)70-45(64)35(31(10)57)51-40(59)32-17-15-21-49-54(32)41(60)30(9)53(11)42(61)34(24-69-12)56(68)43(62)33-18-16-22-50-55(33)44(36)63/h13,23,25,27-28,30-36,38-39,49-50,57,66-68H,14-22,24H2,1-12H3,(H,51,59)(H,52,65)/b26-13+,29-23+/t27-,28?,30+,31-,32+,33+,34-,35+,36-,38-,39?,47+,48+/m0/s1 Key: GXVLICYFXVVWOH-RKMZHTRFSA-N
- SMILES: O=C1O[C@@H](C(C)C)[C@@H](C(=O)N3NCCC[C@@H]3C(=O)N(O)[C@H](C(=O)N(C)[C@@H](C(=O)N2NCCC[C@@H]2C(=O)N[C@@H]1[C@@H](O)C)C)COC)NC(=O)[C@@](O)([C@]4(O)OC(/C(=C/C(C(=O)/C(=C/C)C)C)C)[C@H](CC4)C)CC

Properties
Chemical formula	C_{48}H_{78}N_{8}O_{15}
Molar mass	1007.193 g·mol^{−1}
- Except where otherwise noted, data are given for materials in their standard state (at 25 °C [77 °F], 100 kPa). Infobox references

Kettapeptin is a depsipeptide antibiotic isolated from Streptomyces. It is effective against gram positive bacteria, as well as the fungi Candida albicans, Mucor miehei, and the microalgae Scenedesmus subspicatus.
