= Guadinomine =

Chemical structure of guadinomine B

Guadinomines are anti-infective compounds produced by Streptomyces sp. K01-0509. Guadinomine B is the most potent known inhibitor of the Type III secretion system (TTSS) of Gram-negative bacteria. The guadinomine (gdn) biosynthetic gene cluster includes 26 open reading frames spanning 51.2 kb. Streptomyces sp. K01-0509 produces several derivatives named guadinomines A, B, C1, C2, D, and guadinomic acid.
