= Mayamycin =

Names
- IUPAC name 1,6,8-Trihydroxy-5-[(2R,4R,5S,6R)-5-hydroxy-6-methyl-4-(methylamino)oxan-2-yl]-3-methylbenzo[a]anthracene-7,12-dione
- Other names Mayamycin A

Identifiers
CAS Number	1234432-89-3
3D model (JSmol)	Interactive image
ChemSpider	29214273
PubChem CID	46872823
CompTox Dashboard (EPA)	DTXSID801045536
- InChI: InChI=1S/C26H25NO7/c1-10-7-13-18(16(29)8-10)21-22(25(32)19-12(24(21)31)5-4-6-15(19)28)26(33)20(13)17-9-14(27-3)23(30)11(2)34-17/h4-8,11,14,17,23,27-30,33H,9H2,1-3H3/t11-,14-,17-,23-/m1/s1 Key: ZVIQDPQQFMVLGU-XTCBYOQUSA-N
- SMILES: Cc1cc2c(c(c1)O)c3c(c(c2[C@H]4C[C@H]([C@@H]([C@H](O4)C)O)NC)O)C(=O)c5c(cccc5O)C3=O

Properties
Chemical formula	C_{26}H_{25}NO_{7}
Molar mass	463.486 g·mol^{−1}
- Except where otherwise noted, data are given for materials in their standard state (at 25 °C [77 °F], 100 kPa). Infobox references

Mayamycin is a cytotoxic polyketide isolated from a marine Streptomyces.
