= Neothramycin =

Group of chemical compounds

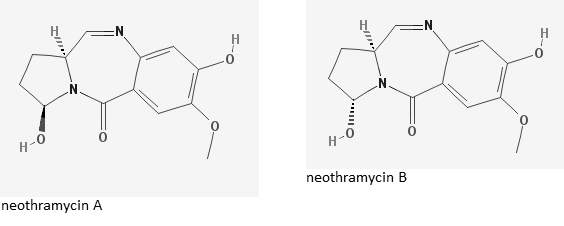
Neothramycin A and B

Neothramycin A and B are stereoisomeric antibiotics with anticancer activity. The stereoisomers are interchangeable in aqueous solution and the antibiotic, Neothramycin, contains both in approximately equal amounts. They belong to the pyrrolo(1,4)benzodiazepine, or anthramycin, group which includes other antibiotics such as anthramycin, tomaymycin, and sibiromycin. Neothramycin was originally isolated from Streptomyces No. MC916-C4, a cycloheximide-producing strain, by Umezawa et al. Subsequent testing has shown its capabilities as an anticancer drug, antiprotozoal drug, and even possible uses in DNA fluorescence based assays. Its activities against cancer warranted phase I testing of the drug. More recently, in 1991, anthramycin derivatives, which are very similar to neothramycin, have been investigated for their ability to link DNA when dimerized. These compounds were tested using a fluorescence based assay. These compounds showed an ability to bind dG-containing DNA duplexes with high specificity. This specificity of a DNA crosslinking agent is highly sought after since most are electrophiles and bind indiscriminately. The data collected also showed that pyrrolo(1,4)benzodiazepines can also be used to measure the fluorescence polarization anisotropy on the 0.1-100 ns time scale.

== Activity ==
Neothramycin shows weak antimicrobial activity compared to other pyrrolo(1,4)benzodiazepines. It also shows lower toxicity in mice. Neothramycin has been shown to exhibit activity against Yoshida sarcoma in rats, leukemia P388, sarcoma 180, Ehrlich Ascites carcinoma, Walker carcinosarcoma-256, and light activity against leukemia L-1210 in mice. These activities against cancer are typical to the activities seen in the other pyrrolo(1,4)benzodiazepine compounds. Neothramycin has also been tested, alongside other compounds, against malaria and for antiprotozoal activity. It showed moderate activity towards malaria with an IC_{50} value of about 1 μg/mL. Neothramycin also showed high cytotoxicity towards MRC-5 cells with and IC_{50} of 390 ng/mL. Butylneothramycin A, a derivative of neothramycin, showed 6-7 fold lower antiprotozoal activity than neothramycin.

== Mechanism ==
Neothramycin’s mode of action is widely known to be through the inhibition of DNA-dependent RNA and DNA polymerase. The antibiotic activity of neothramycin was determined to be directly binding DNA by UV-Vis absorption measurements with differing concentrations of DNA and neothramycin. The first studies of neothramycin began thinking that DNA was the chemoreceptor due to the inhibition of DNA and RNA polymerase that they observed when neothramycin was added. The antibiotic activity, since these first studies, has been determined to be due to its direct binding of DNA. More specifically, the neothramycin binds the NH_{2} of guanine in the minor groove. This binding was shown to only occur when the DNA is in duplex. This type of binding is observed in the other pyrrolo(1,4)benzodiazepines as well. However, the binding of neothramycin to DNA is much slower than the other compounds in the group. This binding of neothramycin to DNA does not significantly change the melting temperature of the DNA.

== Clinical Testing ==
Neothramycin went through phase I testing between June 1979 and June 1981. They determined the maximum tolerable dose to be 60 mg/m^{2} per single injection. Approximately half of the patients experienced nausea and vomiting, the most severe toxicity observed. Some hepatotoxic and nephrotoxic effects were observed but were reversible. The phase I clinical trial determined that 30–40 mg/m^{2} would be the optimal dose for phase II.
