= Ossamycin =

Names
- IUPAC name (1S,3S,6′R,7S,8E,15R,16R,17S,18R,19R,20S,21R,22E,26S,28R,30R)-17-[5-(dimethylamino)-6-methyloxan-2-yl]oxy-3,15,16,18,20,21-hexahydroxy-6′-[(2R)-2-hydroxybutyl]-5,5,15,19,21,30-hexamethylspiro[4,25,29-trioxatricyclo[24.3.1.0^{3,7}]triaconta-8,22-diene-28,2′-oxane]-24-one

Identifiers
CAS Number	11015-84-2
3D model (JSmol)	Interactive image
ChEBI	CHEBI:77735
ChEMBL	ChEMBL1713335
ChemSpider	8923652
PubChem CID	5351598
RTECS number	RN1350000
CompTox Dashboard (EPA)	DTXSID801336866
- InChI: InChI=1S/C49H85NO14/c1-11-34(51)26-35-19-17-24-48(62-35)28-37-30(2)38(63-48)29-49(58)33(27-45(5,6)64-49)18-15-13-12-14-16-23-46(7,56)44(55)42(61-40-21-20-36(50(9)10)32(4)59-40)41(53)31(3)43(54)47(8,57)25-22-39(52)60-37/h15,18,22,25,30-38,40-44,51,53-58H,11-14,16-17,19-21,23-24,26-29H2,1-10H3/b18-15+,25-22+/t30-,31+,32?,33+,34+,35+,36?,37-,38-,40?,41+,42-,43-,44+,46+,47+,48+,49-/m0/s1 Key: XGECDDPXIKFBTE-ZVNFYDRVSA-N
- SMILES: CC[C@H](C[C@H]1CCC[C@]2(O1)C[C@H]3[C@@H]([C@@H](O2)C[C@]4([C@@H](CC(O4)(C)C)/C=C/CCCCC[C@@]([C@@H]([C@H]([C@@H]([C@H]([C@@H]([C@](/C=C/C(=O)O3)(C)O)O)C)O)OC5CCC(C(O5)C)N(C)C)O)(C)O)O)C)O

Properties
Chemical formula	C_{49}H_{85}NO_{14}
Molar mass	912.212 g·mol^{−1}
- Except where otherwise noted, data are given for materials in their standard state (at 25 °C [77 °F], 100 kPa). Infobox references

Ossamycin is a fermentation-derived natural product belonging to a family of 22- to 26-membered macrocyclic polyketides which is featured with a 6,6-spiroacetal (1,7-dioxaspiro[5,5]-undecanyl) moiety connected to one side of the macrocycle. Widely-studied 26-membered oligomycins/rutamycins, 24-membered dunaimycins, and 22-membered cytovaricin are also in this family.

== Medical uses ==
Ossamycin from Streptomyces hygroscopicus var. ossamyceticus is an antifungal and cytotoxic polyketide and a potent inhibitor of the F0 component of mitochondrial F1F0-ATPase, which were shown to be among the top 0.1% most cell line selective cytotoxic agents of 37,000 molecules tested against the 60 human cancer cell lines of the National Cancer Institute.

== History ==
Ossamycin was originally isolated in 1965 from culture broths of Streptomyces hygroscopicus var. ossamyceticus. Studies in 1969 showed that ossamycin contained an unusual aminodeoxysaccharide that was given the name, ossamine. After nearly 30 years in 1995, its three-dimensional structure and relative stereochemistry were totally determined by single crystal X-ray diffraction studies.

== Biosynthesis ==
Polyketides members in this family have very similar skeleton which means they share a common pathway for their biosynthesis. However, ossamycin modular PKS is rare and unique since its programmed iteration is required to assemble its product considering that only 14 extension modules have to accomplish 15 cycles of polyketide chain extension in ossamycin. And cytochrome P450 enzymes are involved in post-PKS oxidation of the ossamycin macrocycle. Unusual 2,3,4,6-deoxyaminohexose sugar L-ossamine need to be attached to C-8 of the ossamycin macrocycle in tailoring stage.

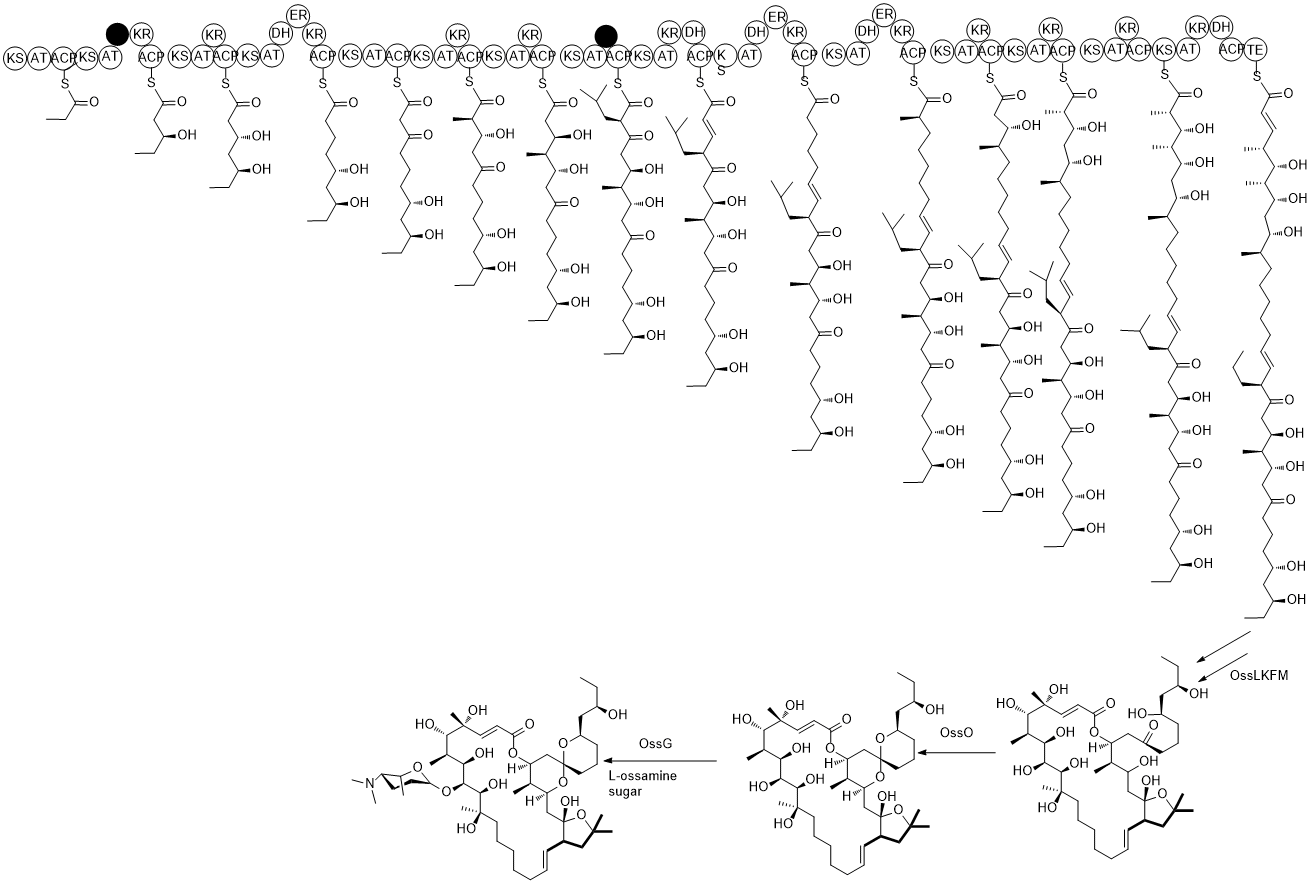

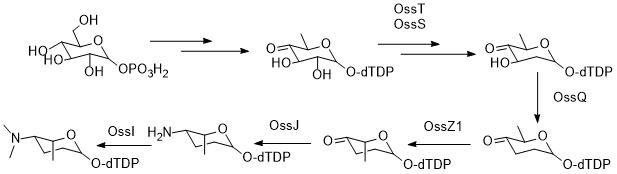
