= Modifications (genetics) =

The term modifications in genetics refers to both naturally occurring and engineered changes in DNA. Incidental, or natural, mutations occur following errors during replication and repair, either spontaneously or due to environmental stressors. Intentional modifications are done in a laboratory for various purposes, developing hardier seeds and plants, and increasingly to treat human disease. The use of gene editing technology remains controversial.

== Genetic modifications (incidental and intentional) ==
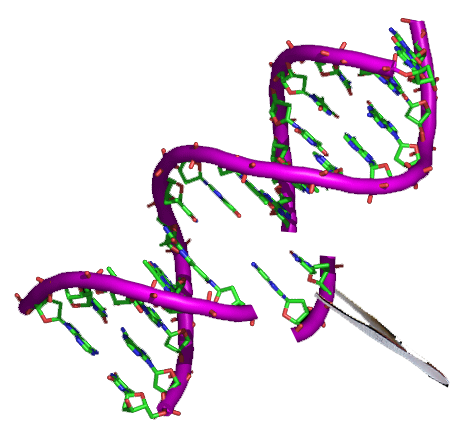
Visualization of genetic modification with a piece of DNA being removed by tweezers

Modifications are changes in an individual's DNA due to incidental mutation or intentional genetic modification using various biotechnologies. Although confusion exists between the terms "modification" and "mutation" as they are often used interchangeably, modification differentiates itself from mutation because it acts as an umbrella term, encompassing both definitions of mutation and genetic engineering. Both of these subcategorizations result in a change affecting an organism's observable characteristics, also known as their phenotype, caused due to alterations in an organism's genotype, or their specific alleles, resulting in altered gene expression. Although heritability plays a large role in an individual's expression, like in cases of epigenetic modifications, not all instances of modification are heritable. No matter the origins of such genetic variation, it impacts the creation and interaction of proteins, changing cell function, phenotype, and organism function.

=== Types of modification ===
Genetic modifications can occur naturally, through aforementioned mutations in an organism's genome, or through biotechnological methods of selecting a gene of interest to manipulate in order to make something new or improve upon what already exists. This distinction between changes that occur naturally and those that are intentional is key to understanding the difference between mutation and genetic engineering.

==== Mutation (incidental) ====
Mutation can be more accurately defined as any non-combinatorial change in phenotype that is able to be consistently inherited from parent to offspring over generations. Mutations can be attributed to many factors and come in numerous different forms. However, they can mostly be attributed to mistakes that occur during DNA replication or exposure to external factors. Although cellular processes are highly efficient, they are not perfect, causing disparities between organisms of the same species. These disparities can create many different phenotypic effects of all intensities, ranging from no observable impact at all to possible inviability. Due to environmental conditions such as climate, diet, oxygen levels, light cycles, and mutagens or chemicals which are strongly related to disease susceptibility, gene expression can vary. The timing and duration of exposure to such elements is a critical factor, as it can significantly impact the phenotypic response of an organism, generally increasing severity with time.

Methods:

There are several methods, or forms, of mutation that exist including spontaneous mutation, errors during replication and repair, as well as mutation due to environmental effects. These origins of mutations can cause many different types of mutations which influence gene expression on both large and small scales.

==== Genetic engineering (intentional) ====
Genetic engineering is a type of intentional genetic modification, which uses biotechnology to alter an organism's genome. According to World Health Organization (WHO), genetically modified organisms are defined as "Organisms (i.e. plants, animals or microorganisms) in which the genetic material (DNA) has been altered in a way that does not occur naturally by mating and/or natural recombination”. This type of modification can involve insertions or deletions of DNA bases into the existing genetic code. In biotechnological methodology, a series of four steps are used in order to create a genetically modified organism (GMO).

  1. Identify
    1. Researchers identify a trait of interest usually based on a desire to solve a problem.
  2. Isolate
    1. Researchers the sequence of the specific trait by comparing genomes of organisms within the same species, with and without the trait.
  3. Insert
    1. Next, they utilize the sequence(s) and various enzymes to insert the trait's genes into a plasmid vector, which can then be inserted into bacteria to propagate the preferable gene.
  4. Grow
    1. A sign of the creation of a successful GMO is growth and replication with the newly edited genome with no detriments to the organism due to the new modification.

Methods:

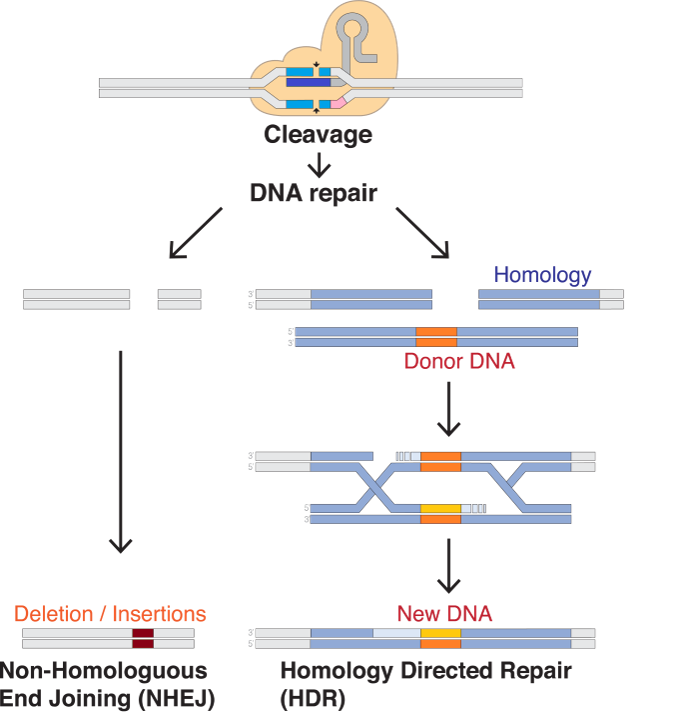
Image depicts the CRISPR genome editing proc.

CRISPR methods are a popularly used type of the aforementioned process of genome editing. Standing for 'Clustered Regularly Interspaced Short Palindromic Repeats', CRISPR gene editing allows scientists to manually alter gene expression, correcting errors or creating new variations. Since 2012, scientists have worked to develop this technology, which has the opportunity to both cure genetic diseases and genetically modify traits to be most desirable, purposefully altering DNA with a high degree of precision.

=== Examples ===
==== Mutation (incidental) ====
The dandelion: Most dandelions have long stems, but an increase in potential threats in their environment have caused average dandelion stem length to decrease within certain species, allowing them to better avoid said threats. This adaptation was possible due to a mutation occurring in a shorter-stemmed individual being selected by environmental pressures. Because the shorter-stemmed dandelions had higher fitness than long-stemmed dandelions and were able to survive more often, the genetic frequency of the population was altered, genetically modified through the original occurrence of a mutation.

Sickle cell disease: In a healthy individual, the HBB gene is responsible for encoding hemoglobin which carries oxygen throughout the body. However, when a person has this disease due to inheriting two mutated copies of the HBB gene due to a base pair point mutation, their red blood cells are shaped differently. This altered shape results in blockages of blood flow with serious health implications. On the other hand, those who inherit only one mutated copy of this gene have higher protection against malaria.

==== Genetic engineering (intentional) ====
Alzheimer's disease: In a synthetic example in a laboratory, scientists isolated the amyloid precursor protein (APP) gene, known for using Alzheimer's in humans, and transmitted it into the nerve cells of worms. In doing this, scientists aimed to study the progression of Alzheimer's disease in this simple organism by tagging the APP protein with green fluorescent protein which allowed them to better visualize the gene as the worm aged. Using what they learned from experimentation with the simple worm and the APP gene, scientists increased their understanding of this gene's role in causing Alzheimer's disease in humans.

Insulin: The first use of genetically modified bacteria was for the medical insulin that diabetics need to medically control their blood sugar. Through the following steps, scientists are able to genetically engineer a medical product that millions of people rely on worldwide:

1. A small piece of DNA is extracted from a circular form of bacterial or yeast DNA called a plasmid. A scientist will extract this DNA through using specific restriction enzymes.
2. Then, a scientist will insert the human gene for insulin into the gap left by the extracted DNA. This plasmid is now considered a genetically modified entity.
3. The genetically modified entity is reintroduced into a new bacterial or yeast cell.
4. This cell will then undergo mitosis and divide rapidly, producing insulin suitable for human needs.
5. Scientists grow the genetically modified bacteria or yeast in large fermentation vessels, which contain all of their necessary nutrients, and allow large amounts of insulin to be cultivated.
6. When fermentation is complete, the mixture is filtered to produce the final the insulin.
7. The insulin is then purified and packaged into bottles and insulin pens for distribution to patients with diabetes.

=== Ethics of genetic engineering ===
Common products of genetic engineering

Fast-paced developments in the CRISPR-Cas9 gene editing technology has increased both the concerns and relevance of this ethical controversy as it has become more popularly used. The scientific community recommends continued evaluation of risks and benefits of utilizing genetically modified organisms in everyday life. Genetic modifications are studied by researchers under controlled conditions after they are inserted into an organism, allowing for improved scientific understanding of the effects of certain gene modifications and certain organism responses.

==== Humans ====
In April 2015, gene editing technology was used on human embryos and debate about the ethics of such actions persisted since. Nonetheless, scientists and policymakers are in agreement that public deliberations should decide the legality of germ line genome editing. Modifying a person's non-heritable DNA with the goal of improving one's medical condition is generally accepted and has a plethora of ethical protocols monitoring such procedures. This includes modifications like organ donation, bone marrow transplants, and types of gene therapies, all of which consider cultural and religious values. On the other hand, there is contention surrounding heritable gene modification exemplified by the fact that 19 countries have outlawed this type of genetic modification. For those who believe the vitility of a human embryo is equivalent to an adult, genome editing in early development occurring at or immediately following fertilization raises moral concerns. In order to mitigate these concerns, studies using human embryos have used embryos from left over IVF treatments. Scientists have also suggested creating fertilized zygotes from donated sperm and eggs strictly for research purposes. However, this raises an additional ethical concern within the scientific community about the concept of a zygote being created only to be used for experimentation.

==== Foods ====
Debate also surrounds genetically engineered food in terms of the controversial health and environmental effects that it may have in various time scales. Regulations have been implemented for approval of genetically modified foods to reduce some uncertainty that remains in this field. The reasons in favor of development of genetically modified foods include to meet the demands of the exponentially growing human population, to substitute for the decrease in farmable land, and to address the decrease in genetic diversity which limits possible improvement of species. Additional benefits include improved herbicide tolerance, increased pest and bacterial/fungal/viral resistance, higher stress tolerance, and increased nutrient content within the organism. The biotechnology of genetic engineering provides the opportunity to achieve global food security by addressing these problems and positively impacting the food production economy. Potential health risks are also being researched and there are requirements for the safety of genetically modified foods to be clarified before they are consumed by the public. Environmental consequences are also considered due to disruptions within the food web when these organisms are added to a previously balanced ecosystem. As genetic modification is so fast, the environment may not be able to adapt and integrate the new organism into the ecosystem or it could have unwanted effects on its surroundings. Other impacts on the environment include unnatural gene flow, modification of soil and water chemistry, and reduction of species diversity.

=== Future implications of modification ===
Ethical considerations regarding gene editing are largely controversial within the scientific community due to its open ended implications for the rest of society. Although no consensus has been reached, there are plans in place to utilize the available resources to continue education, scientific research as well as research on ethical, legal, and social issues associated with genetic modification.
