= Gentamicin protection assay =

Technique in microbiology

The gentamicin protection assay or survival assay or invasion assay is a method used in microbiology. It is used to quantify the ability of pathogenic bacteria to invade eukaryotic cells.

The assay is based on several observations made in the 1970s, in which the ability of internalized bacteria to avoid killing by antibiotics was reported. The assay started to be used in biological research in the early 1980s.

== Background and principle ==
Intracellular bacteria need to enter host cells (cells of the infected organism) in order to replicate and propagate infection. Many species of Shigella (causes bacillary dysentery), Salmonella (typhoid fever), Mycobacterium (leprosy and tuberculosis) and Listeria (listeriosis), to name but a few, are intracellular.

Several antibiotics cannot penetrate eukaryotic cells. Therefore, these antibiotics cannot hurt intracellular bacteria that are already internalized. Using such antibiotics enables us to differentiate between bacteria that succeed in penetrating eukaryotic cells and those that do not. Applying such an antibiotic to a culture of eukaryotic cells infected with bacteria would kill the bacteria that remain outside the cells while sparing the ones that penetrated. The antibiotic of choice for this assay is the aminoglycoside gentamicin.

== Procedure ==
The chemical structure of gentamicin

HeLa cells are commonly used as eukaryotic cells in the gentamicin protection assay, but other cells can be used as well. As for bacteria, only species susceptible to gentamicin can be assayed.

The assay is performed in plastic microtiter plates, which are commonly used in laboratories for culturing eukaryotic cells. The cells are allowed to grow in the wells overnight, creating a flat layer. Bacteria are separately grown overnight. On the next day the eukaryotic cells are inoculated with the bacteria and are incubated together for an hour. Centrifuging the plates for a few minutes may help bring cells and bacteria in contact and initiate infection.

After infection gentamicin is added to the plates, and they are incubated for an hour, allowing the antibiotic to kill all bacteria that were not able to penetrate the cells and remained outside. The plates are then washed well to remove the dead bacteria. Next the eukaryotic cells are lysed using a detergent, most commonly Triton X-100.

The bacteria that penetrated the cells and remained alive are now released, and they are plated on solid medium plates. Counting the colonies formed on the plates on the next day, and knowing how many bacteria were used in the beginning of the assay, enables the researcher to calculate the percentage of bacteria that were able to invade the eukaryotic cells.

== Usage, advantages and caveats ==
The gentamicin protection assay is commonly used in pathogen research. The contribution of specific genes or proteins to the bacteria's ability to invade cells can be easily assayed using this method. The gene in question can be knocked out, and the bacteria's invasiveness compared with that of normal, wild type bacteria. Environmental conditions, such as pH level and temperature, can also be assayed for their effect on invasiveness.

The gentamicin protection assay is very sensitive, as it can detect the internalization of even single bacteria. It has several drawbacks:

- Gentamicin can sometimes penetrate eukaryotic cells and kill the internalized bacteria. This may happen if the permeability of the cells somehow increased during the assay, sometimes due to poor handling of the cells.
- Internalized bacteria may sometimes not be entirely protected from the outside environment, such as when the phagosome (the vacuole surrounding the bacterium inside the cell) is defective in some way. Gentamicin may kill those bacteria.
- Gentamicin may fail to kill all the bacteria that remained outside the cells.

To help assess the accuracy of a particular assay, positive and negative controls should be performed. When performing the assay as described above, bacteria that are known to be entirely invasive (positive control) and bacteria that are known as non-invasive (negative control) should be included in the assay.

An alternative invasion assay is the differential immunostaining assay, based on the binding of antibodies to bacteria before and after invasion. The antibodies emit fluorescent, colored light, and the results of this assay are viewed under the microscope.

== See also ==
- Obligate intracellular parasite
