= Germicidin =

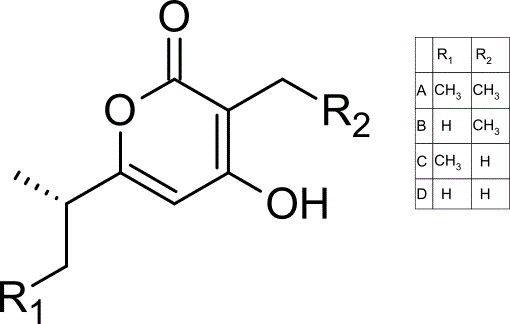
- Chemical structure of germicidins A-D

Names
- IUPAC names 3-Ethyl-4-hydroxy-6-isopropyl-2H-pyran-2-one (germicidin A); 6-(sec-Butyl)-4-hydroxy-3-methyl-2H-pyran-2-one (germicidin B); 6-(sec-Butyl)-3-ethyl-4-hydroxy-2H-pyran-2-one (germicidin C); 4-Hydroxy-6-isopropyl-3-methyl-2H-pyran-2-one (germicidin D)
- Other names surugapyrone A (Germicidin D)

Identifiers
CAS Number	151271-57-7
3D model (JSmol)	A: Interactive image; B: Interactive image; C: Interactive image; D: Interactive image
ChemSpider	A: 35467266; B: 35467202; C: 28586862; D: 2828782
PubChem CID	A: 102106080; B: 86169826; C: 54704417; D: 54750380
CompTox Dashboard (EPA)	DTXSID20934217
- InChI: Key: NPQKQKITPJTEBK-UHFFFAOYSA-N; A: InChI=1S/C11H16O3/c1-4-7(3)10-6-9(12)8(5-2)11(13)14-10/h6-7,12H,4-5H2,1-3H3/t7-/m0/s1 Key: NPQKQKITPJTEBK-ZETCQYMHSA-N; B: InChI=1S/C10H14O3/c1-4-7-8(11)5-9(6(2)3)13-10(7)12/h5-6,11H,4H2,1-3H3 Key: SZBDLUWYHDLLAG-UHFFFAOYSA-N; C: InChI=1S/C11H16O3/c1-4-7(3)10-6-9(12)8(5-2)11(13)14-10/h6-7,12H,4-5H2,1-3H3; D: InChI=1S/C9H12O3/c1-5(2)8-4-7(10)6(3)9(11)12-8/h4-5,10H,1-3H3 Key: SRGRIOXSONGZCM-UHFFFAOYSA-N
- SMILES: A: CCC1=C(C=C(OC1=O)[C@@H](C)CC)O; B: CCC1=C(C=C(OC1=O)C(C)C)O; C: CCC1=C(C=C(OC1=O)C(C)CC)O; D: CC1=C(C=C(OC1=O)C(C)C)O

Properties
Chemical formula	Germicidin A/B - C_{10}H_{14}O_{3}, Germicidin C - C_{11}H_{16}O_{3}, Germicidin D - C_{9}H_{12}O_{3}
Molar mass	Germicidin A/B - 182.22g/mol, Germicidin C - 196.25g/mol, Germicidin D - 168.19g/mol
- Except where otherwise noted, data are given for materials in their standard state (at 25 °C [77 °F], 100 kPa). Infobox references

Germicidins are a groups of natural products arising from Streptomyces species that acts as autoregulatory inhibitor of spore germination. In Streptomyces viriochromogenes, low concentrations (200 pM) inhibit germination of its own arthrospores, and higher concentrations inhibit porcine Na+/K+ -activated ATPase. Inhibitory effects on germination are also observed when germicidin from Streptomyces is applied to Lepidium sativum. Germicidins and other natural products present potential use as pharmaceuticals, and in this case, those with possible antibiotic or antifungal activity.

Four germicidin homologs have been isolated from Streptomyces coelicor: germicidin A, germicidin B, germicidin C, and surugapyrone A (germicidin D). All compounds inhibit spore germination. Germicidin A exhibits reversible inhibition as well as having activity resulting in hyphal elongation.

== Biosynthesis ==
Biosynthesis of the germicidin A, B, and C is achieved through a type III polyketide synthase called germicidin synthase (Gcs). Surugapyrone A is expected to be synthesized similarly utilizing a Gcs homolog. Gcs exhibits high substrate flexibility accepting a variety of acyl groups carried and transferred through a thioester bond by either coenzyme A (CoA) or acyl carrier protein (ACP). Catalytic efficiency is tenfold higher when ACP is the acyl carrier. Crystal structures of Gcs indicate a characteristic type III structure with the exception of an unusual insertion of 40-residues at the dimer interface.

The biosynthetic pathway of germicidin has not been fully confirmed but according to experimental evidence is expected to utilize starter units arising from fatty acid synthesis and utilize the following proposed scheme: AcpP(ACP) is converted from its apo to holo form with CoA and AcpS (ACP synthase). FabD then converts holo-AcpP into malonyl-AcpP with malonyl-CoA. With either isobutyryl-CoA or 2-methylbutyryl-CoA FabH facilitates decarboxylative condensation with malonyl-AcpP to generate an acyl-AcpP intermediate. The acyl intermediate is then condensed and cyclized with either methylmalonyl-CoA or ethylmalonyl-CoA by Gcs to produce germicidin.

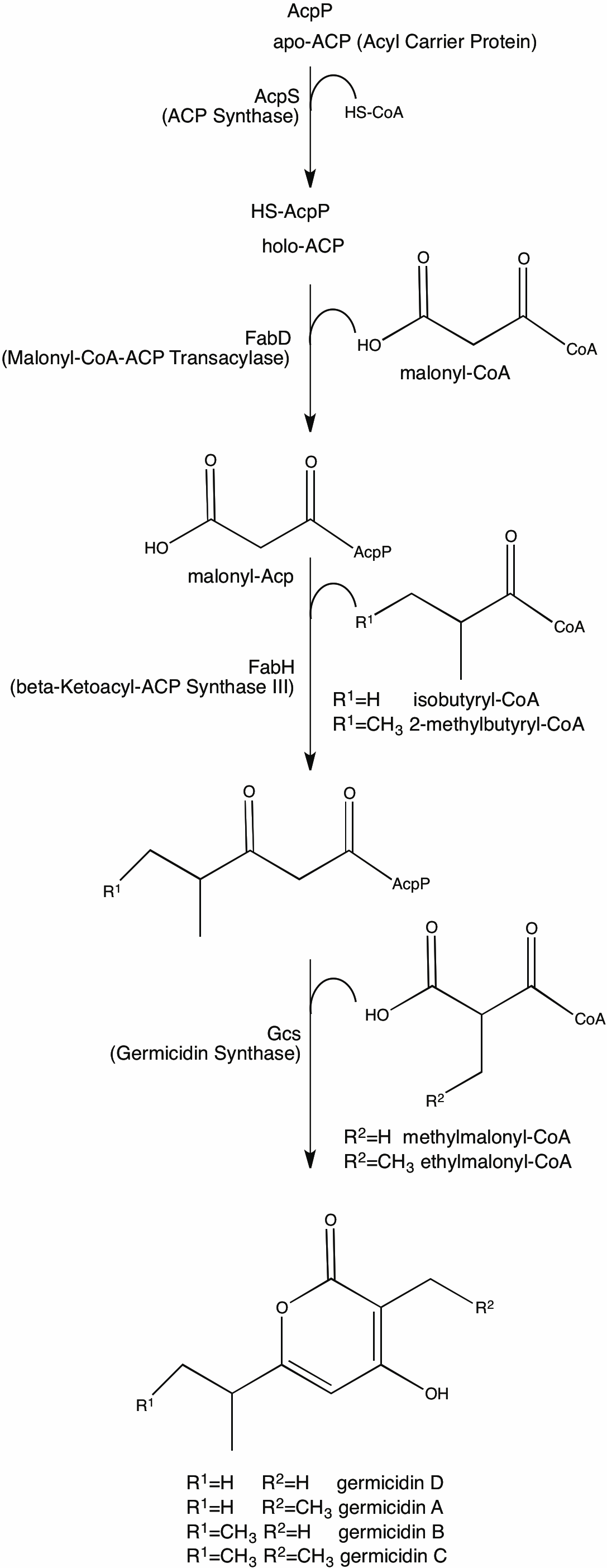
Biosynthesis of Germicidin

== Types ==
letter	3- position	6- position
A	ethyl	sec-butyl
B	ethyl	isopropyl
C		
D	methyl	isopropyl
F	2-methylpropyl	propan
G	2-methylpropyl	butyl
H	methyl	propyl
I	methyl	2-methylpropyl
J	methyl	butyl
