= Sibiromycin =

Names
- IUPAC name (6R,6aS)-2-[(2S,3R,4R,5S,6S)-3,4-dihydroxy-4,6-dimethyl-5-(methylamino)oxan-2-yl]oxy-4,6-dihydroxy-3-methyl-8-[(E)-prop-1-enyl]-5,6,6a,7-tetrahydropyrrolo[2,1-c][1,4]benzodiazepin-11-one
- Other names Sybiromycin

Identifiers
| CAS Number | 12684-33-2 |
| 3D model (JSmol) | Interactive image |
| ChEBI | CHEBI:90941 |
| ChEMBL | ChEMBL462584 |
| ChemSpider | 4941925 |
| PubChem CID | 6437361 |
| CompTox Dashboard (EPA) | DTXSID101318295 |
- InChI: InChI=1S/C24H33N3O7/c1-6-7-13-8-15-21(30)26-17-14(22(31)27(15)10-13)9-16(11(2)18(17)28)34-23-20(29)24(4,32)19(25-5)12(3)33-23/h6-7,9-10,12,15,19-21,23,25-26,28-30,32H,8H2,1-5H3/b7-6+/t12-,15-,19-,20-,21+,23-,24+/m0/s1 Key: RAGFPHFDFVNLCG-INYQBOQCSA-N
- SMILES: C/C=C/C1=CN2[C@@H](C1)[C@H](NC3=C(C(=C(C=C3C2=O)O[C@H]4[C@@H]([C@]([C@H]([C@@H](O4)C)NC)(C)O)O)C)O)O

Properties
| Chemical formula | C_{24}H_{33}N_{3}O_{7} |
| Molar mass | 475.542 g·mol^{−1} |
- Except where otherwise noted, data are given for materials in their standard state (at 25 °C [77 °F], 100 kPa). Infobox references

Sibiromycin is an antitumor antibiotic with the molecular formula C_{24}H_{33}N_{3}O_{7} which is produced by the bacterium Streptosporangium sibiricum. Sibiromycin is a pyrrolobenzodiazepine.
