= Daunosamine =

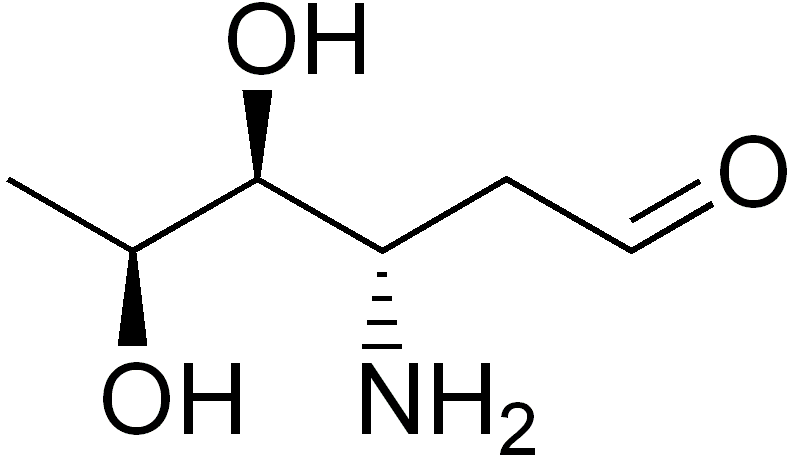

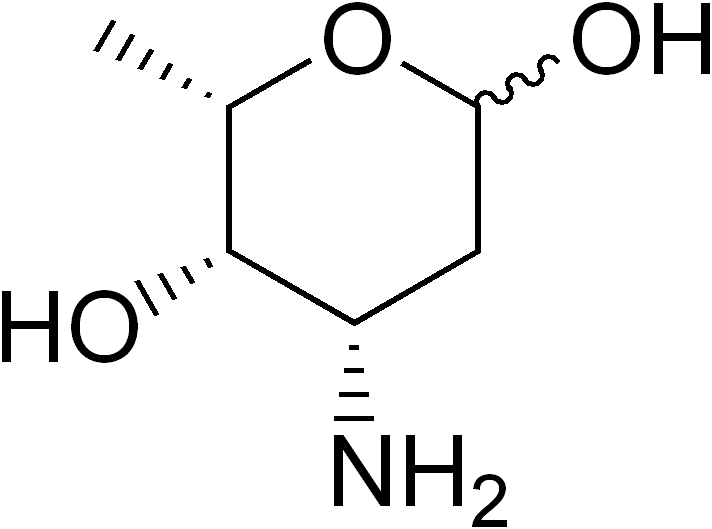

Names
- IUPAC names Linear:(3S,4S,5S)-3-amino-4,5-dihydroxyhexanal; Pyranose: (3S,4S,5S)-4-amino-6-methyl-tetrahydropyran-2,5-diol
- Other names 3-Amino-2,3,6-trideoxy-L-lyxo-hexose

Identifiers
CAS Number	26548-47-0 (linear); 4305-54-8 (pyranose)
3D model (JSmol)	Interactive image
ChemSpider	140755
PubChem CID	160128
CompTox Dashboard (EPA)	DTXSID30895022
- InChI: InChI=1S/C6H13NO3/c1-4(9)6(10)5(7)2-3-8/h3-6,9-10H,2,7H2,1H3/t4-,5-,6+/m0/s1 Key: WPJRFCZKZXBUNI-HCWXCVPCSA-N; InChI=1/C6H13NO3/c1-4(9)6(10)5(7)2-3-8/h3-6,9-10H,2,7H2,1H3/t4-,5-,6+/m0/s1 Key: WPJRFCZKZXBUNI-HCWXCVPCBX
- SMILES: C[C@@H]([C@H]([C@H](CC=O)N)O)O

Properties
Chemical formula	C_{6}H_{13}NO_{3}
Molar mass	147.174 g·mol^{−1}
- Except where otherwise noted, data are given for materials in their standard state (at 25 °C [77 °F], 100 kPa). verify (what is ?) Infobox references

Daunosamine is a deoxy sugar and amino sugar of the hexosamine class.

Daunosamine is a component of the anthracycline class of antineoplastics, linked to a derivative of naphthacene. It is a component of birch juice.

The compound is soluble in water and responds with polymers like cellulose and lignin if it is in excess, so collection of birch juice is very helpful for the birch tree.

The dnrQ gene is required for the synthesis of daunosamine.

Daunorubicin

Idarubicin

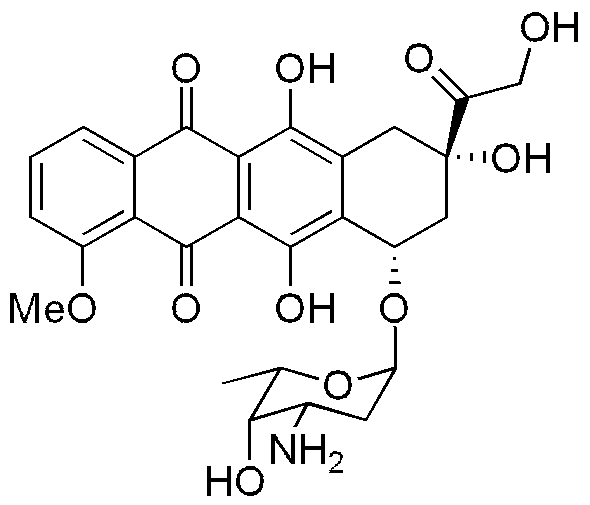
Doxorubicin
