= Isomigrastatin =

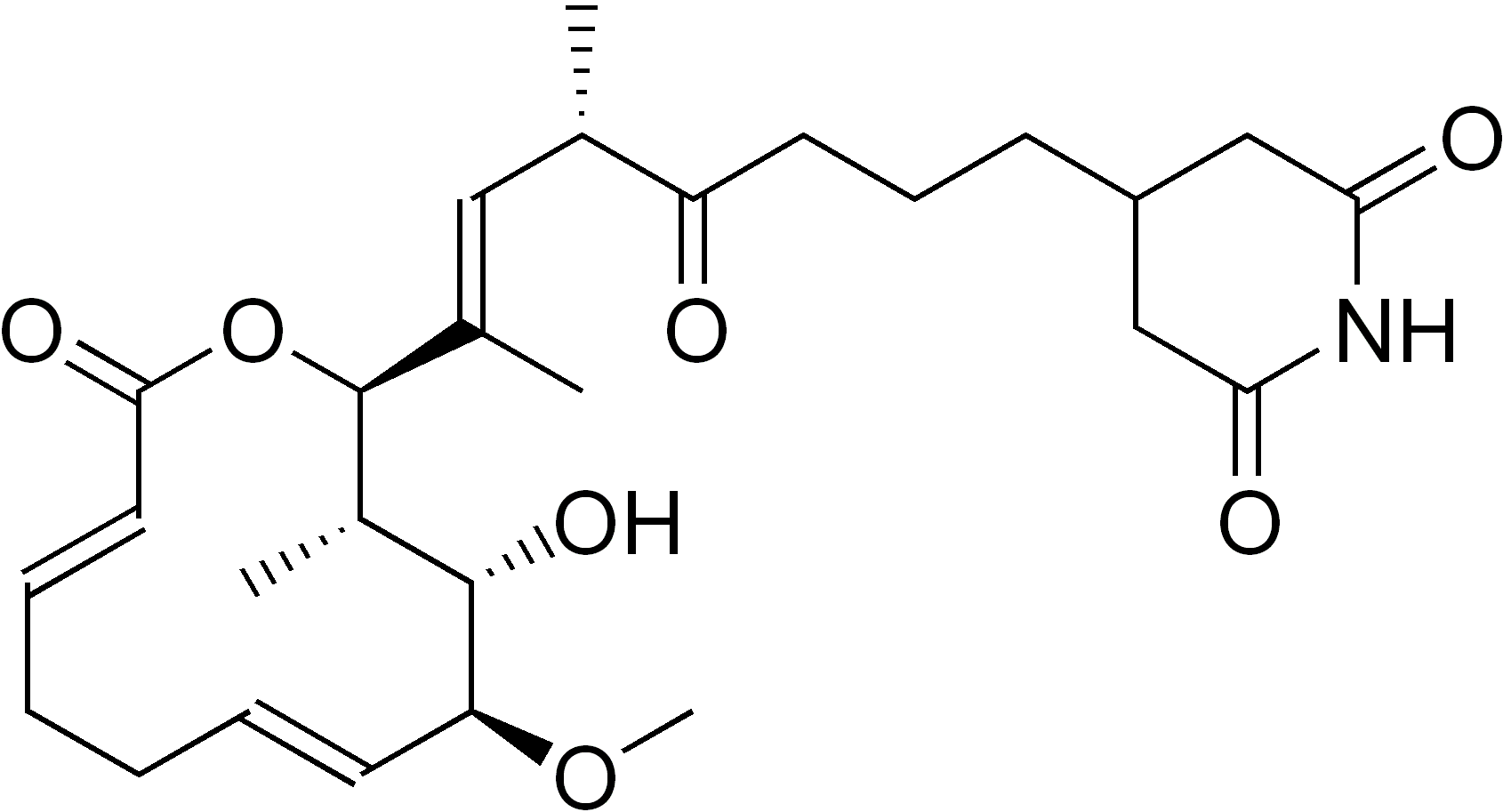

Names
- IUPAC name 4-[7-(4-Hydroxy-5-methoxy-3-methyl-12-oxo-oxacyclododeca-6,10-dien-2-yl)-5-methyl-4-oxo-oct-6-enyl]-piperidine-2,6-dione

Identifiers
CAS Number	415952-70-4
3D model (JSmol)	Interactive image
ChEBI	CHEBI:80125
ChEMBL	ChEMBL1221912
ChemSpider	13083250
PubChem CID	15940571
CompTox Dashboard (EPA)	DTXSID30904042
- InChI: InChI=1S/C27H39NO7/c1-17(21(29)11-9-10-20-15-23(30)28-24(31)16-20)14-18(2)27-19(3)26(33)22(34-4)12-7-5-6-8-13-25(32)35-27/h7-8,12-14,17,19-20,22,26-27,33H,5-6,9-11,15-16H2,1-4H3,(H,28,30,31)/b12-7+,13-8+,18-14+/t17-,19-,22-,26-,27-/m0/s1 Key: TYTDEHCAAKKYOG-FEJRZXFSSA-N; InChI=1/C27H39NO7/c1-17(21(29)11-9-10-20-15-23(30)28-24(31)16-20)14-18(2)27-19(3)26(33)22(34-4)12-7-5-6-8-13-25(32)35-27/h7-8,12-14,17,19-20,22,26-27,33H,5-6,9-11,15-16H2,1-4H3,(H,28,30,31)/b12-7+,13-8+,18-14+/t17-,19-,22-,26-,27-/m0/s1 Key: TYTDEHCAAKKYOG-FEJRZXFSBC
- SMILES: C[C@H]([C@H](/[C@@](C)=C/[C@@H](C(CCCC2CC(NC(C2)=O)=O)=O)C)O1)[C@H](O)[C@@H](OC)/C=C/CC/C=C/C1=O

Properties
Chemical formula	C_{27}H_{39}NO_{7}
Molar mass	489.60 g/mol
- Except where otherwise noted, data are given for materials in their standard state (at 25 °C [77 °F], 100 kPa). verify (what is ?) Infobox references

Isomigrastatin is an analogue of migrastatin, an organic compound that naturally occurs in the Streptomyces platensis bacteria. Isomigrastatin has shown promise as a drug in the treatment of cancer. A laboratory synthesis was reported in 2007.

== Synthesis ==
=== Total synthesis ===
Migrastatin synthesis is a precursor of isomigrastatin. In order to synthesize isomigrastatin, reagent 11 and 15 need to be prepared. Through LACDAC reaction, Luche reduction, aqueous Ferrier rearrangement and Epoxidation, reagent 6, 7, 8, 9, 10 are synthesized to 11. Aldehyde 12 reacts is alkyldenated by Witting reagent 13 to make 14, and 14 is hydrogenated to afford 15.

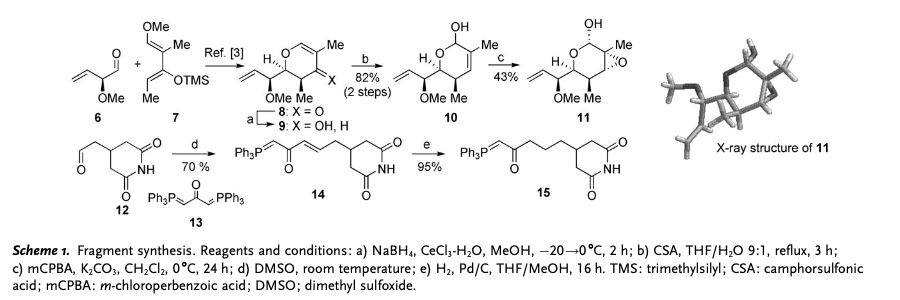

Fragment coupling of intermediate 11 and 15 would be the next step. Using lithium borohydride, lactol arrangement of reagent 11 is reduced to create alcohol 16 which could be converted to 17 as well. Coupled with phosphorane 15, reagent 16 and 17 are oxidized to synthesize aldehyde 18.

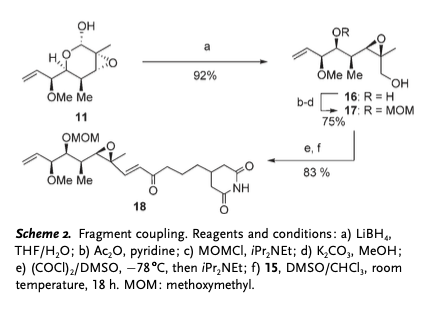

Enone 18 is then reduced by (S)-Me-CBS Corey catalyst to make intermediate 19, and lithium cyanomethylcuprate is added to make intermediate 21.

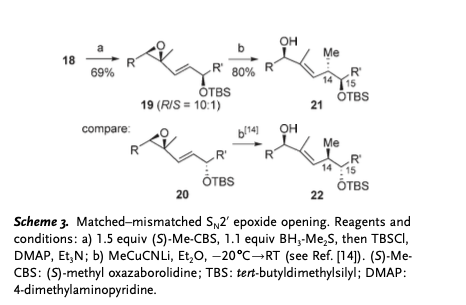

Acylation of alcohol 21 with racemic selenoacid 23 then leads to be intermediate 24, and ring-closing metathesis of 24 causes intermediate 26. Then it finally affords isomigrastatin by oxidative deselenation.

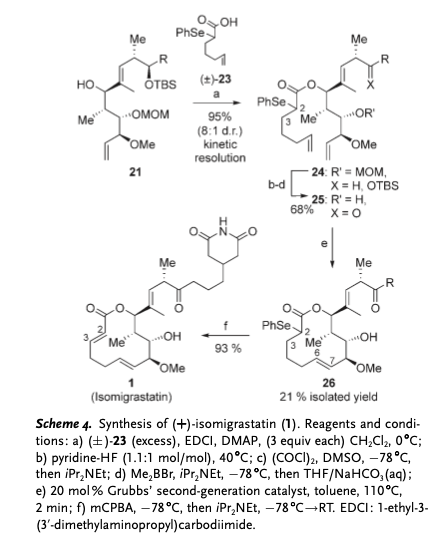

=== Biosynthesis ===
In terms of natural product, isomigrastatin is the polyketide that contains the glutarimide. Biosynthesis of isomigrastatin starts with the PKS product 10 which is derived from S.platensis. PKS product that is lack of methyltransferase domain in module-5, a ketoreductase domain in module-8, and a KR and an enoylreductase domain in module-10 is needed to synthesize intermediate for isomigrastatin. On top of that, four tailoring steps are followed through intermediates. First, hydroxylation at C-8. Second, O-methylation at OHC-8. Third, dehydration at C-17 OH. Last, C-16 and C-17 olefin is reduced. PKS product 10 is then isolated to isomigrastatin.
