= Migrastatin =

- Migrastatin

Names
- Preferred IUPAC name 4-{(5S)-5-[(2R,3Z,5R,6S,7S,8E,12E)-6-Hydroxy-7-methoxy-3,5-dimethyl-14-oxo-1-oxacyclotetradeca-3,8,12-trien-2-yl]-4-oxohexyl}piperidine-2,6-dione

Identifiers
| CAS Number | 314245-65-3 |
| 3D model (JSmol) | Interactive image |
| ChEBI | CHEBI:66389 |
| ChEMBL | ChEMBL474321 |
| ChemSpider | 21106454 |
| PubChem CID | 11016431 |
| CompTox Dashboard (EPA) | DTXSID70904046 |
- InChI: InChI=1S/C27H39NO7/c1-17-14-18(2)27(35-25(32)13-8-6-5-7-12-22(34-4)26(17)33)19(3)21(29)11-9-10-20-15-23(30)28-24(31)16-20/h7-8,12-14,17,19-20,22,26-27,33H,5-6,9-11,15-16H2,1-4H3,(H,28,30,31)/b12-7+,13-8+,18-14-/t17-,19-,22+,26+,27+/m1/s1 Key: OGYMUMAKGYYNHV-IJMHZYIBSA-N; InChI=1/C27H39NO7/c1-17-14-18(2)27(35-25(32)13-8-6-5-7-12-22(34-4)26(17)33)19(3)21(29)11-9-10-20-15-23(30)28-24(31)16-20/h7-8,12-14,17,19-20,22,26-27,33H,5-6,9-11,15-16H2,1-4H3,(H,28,30,31)/b12-7+,13-8+,18-14-/t17-,19-,22+,26+,27+/m1/s1 Key: OGYMUMAKGYYNHV-IJMHZYIBBB
- SMILES: C[C@@H]1/C=C(\[C@H](OC(=O)/C=C/CC/C=C/[C@@H]([C@H]1O)OC)[C@H](C)C(=O)CCCC2CC(=O)NC(=O)C2)/C

Properties
| Chemical formula | C_{27}H_{39}NO_{7} |
| Molar mass | 489.60 g/mol |
- Except where otherwise noted, data are given for materials in their standard state (at 25 °C [77 °F], 100 kPa). verify (what is ?) Infobox references

Migrastatin is an organic compound which naturally occurs in the Streptomyces platensis bacteria. Migrastatin and several of its analogues (including Isomigrastatin) have shown to have potential in treating cancer, as it inhibits the metastasis of cancer cells.
