= Pluramycin A =

Names
- IUPAC name [4-(Dimethylamino)-6-[8-[4-(dimethylamino)-5-hydroxy-6-methyloxan-2-yl]-11-hydroxy-5-methyl-2-[2-methyl-3-[(E)-prop-1-enyl]oxiran-2-yl]-4,7,12-trioxonaphtho[2,3-h]chromen-10-yl]-2,4-dimethyloxan-3-yl] acetate

Identifiers
CAS Number	11016-27-6
3D model (JSmol)	Interactive image
ChemSpider	4742376; 59701363
PubChem CID	5906990
CompTox Dashboard (EPA)	DTXSID001028334
- InChI: InChI=1S/C43H52N2O11/c1-12-13-30-43(7,56-30)31-17-27(47)32-19(2)14-25-34(40(32)55-31)39(51)35-33(38(25)50)23(28-16-26(44(8)9)36(48)20(3)52-28)15-24(37(35)49)29-18-42(6,45(10)11)41(21(4)53-29)54-22(5)46/h12-15,17,20-21,26,28-30,36,41,48-49H,16,18H2,1-11H3/b13-12+ Key: BQCHGWYGWQEMTJ-OUKQBFOZSA-N; InChI=1S/C43H52N2O11/c1-12-13-30-43(7,56-30)31-17-27(47)32-19(2)14-25-34(40(32)55-31)39(51)35-33(38(25)50)23(28-16-26(44(8)9)36(48)20(3)52-28)15-24(37(35)49)29-18-42(6,45(10)11)41(21(4)53-29)54-22(5)46/h12-15,17,20-21,26,28-30,36,41,48-49H,16,18H2,1-11H3/b13-12+
- SMILES: C/C=C/C1C(O1)(C)C2=CC(=O)C3=C(O2)C4=C(C=C3C)C(=O)C5=C(C4=O)C(=C(C=C5C6CC(C(C(O6)C)O)N(C)C)C7CC(C(C(O7)C)OC(=O)C)(C)N(C)C)O

Properties
Chemical formula	C_{43}H_{52}N_{2}O_{11}
Molar mass	772.892 g·mol^{−1}
- Except where otherwise noted, data are given for materials in their standard state (at 25 °C [77 °F], 100 kPa). Infobox references

Pluramycin A is an antibiotic/anticancer compound that inhibits nucleic acid biosynthesis. The pluramycin family of natural products are an important group of complex C-aryl glycoside antibiotics that possess the tetracyclic 4H-anthra[1,2-b]pyran-4,7,12-trione moiety A–D as an aromatic core. The D-ring is adorned with two deoxyaminosugars that are appended by C-aryl glycosidic linkages. The E-ring sugar is angolosamine, a carbohydrate that is also found in the antibiotic angolamycin. The F-ring sugar is the N,N-dimethyl derivative of vancosamine, which is the sugar found in the glycopeptide antibiotic vancomycin.

These compounds exhibit in vitro antitumor activity by DNA alkylation, where the two proximal amino sugars, D-angolosamine and N,N-dimethyl-L-vancosamine, play a key role in sequence recognition in intercalation of the tetracyclic chromophore.
