= Streptomyces platensis =

Scientific classification
- Domain: Bacteria
- Kingdom: Bacillati
- Phylum: Actinomycetota
- Class: Actinomycetes
- Order: Streptomycetales
- Family: Streptomycetaceae
- Genus: Streptomyces
- Species: S. platensis

Binomial name
- Streptomyces platensis Tresner and Backus 1956

Type strain
- ATCC 13865, ATCC 23948, BCRC 11898, CBS 310.56, CBS 932.68, CCRC 11898, CCUG 11118, CGMCC 4.1975, DSM 40041, DSM 41241, ETH 20739, IFO 12901, IFO 14007, ISP 5041, ISP 5401, JCM 4189, JCM 4662, KCC S-0189, KCC S-0662, KCTC 1088, MTCC 3026, NBRC 12901, NBRC 14007, NCAIM B.01481, NCIB 9607, NCIMB 9607, NIHJ 407, NRRL 2364, NRRL B-2364, NRRL B-5486, NRRL-ISP 5041, Pittenger M5-5353, PSA 150, RIA 1110, VKM Ac-1288

Species of bacterium

Streptomyces platensis is a bacterium species from the genus of Streptomyces which has been isolated from soil. Streptomyces platensis produces oxytetracycline, platensimycin, migrastatin, isomigrastatin, platencin, dorrigocin A, dorrigocin B and terramycine.

== See also ==
- List of Streptomyces species
