= SAPI =

SAPI may stand for:

- Speech Application Programming Interface, an API produced by Microsoft for speech recognition and speech synthesis
- Server application programming interface, an API used to interface with web servers such as Apache
- Small Arms Protective Insert, a military ballistic protection system
- Systém automatického pořizování informací (system for automatic gathering of information): SAPI-1, a computer produced in former Czechoslovakia by Tesla
- Network Service Access Point Identifier, an identifier used in GPRS (cellular data) networks.
- SaPI, a family of pathogenicity islands found in Staphylococcus aureus

Sapi may refer to:

- Sapi Safari Area, included in UNESCO World Heritage Site Mana Pools National Park, Sapi and Chewore Safari Areas
- Bull in Indonesian, such as in the Karapan sapi event or various dishes in Indonesian cuisine
- the Portuguese name of the coastal peoples they found in the history of Sierra Leone

== See also ==
- Sappi, a South African pulp and paper company
