= Richard P. Novick =

American emeritus microbiologist

Richard P. Novick is an American microbiologist best known for his work in the fields of plasmid biology, staphylococcal pathobiology and antimicrobial resistance. He is the Recanati Family Professor of Science, Emeritus, at NYU Grossman School of Medicine and is a member of the American National Academy of Sciences. Novick has published over 250 peer-reviewed articles, and several book reviews for the Times Literary Supplement, and is a member of the Editorial Board of the Proceedings of the National Academy of Sciences.

== Early life ==
Novick was born in New York City on August 10, 1932. He has spent most of his life in that city, with the exception of college and medical internship at Yale, residency at Vanderbilt, and a post-doctoral fellowship in London.

== Education and career ==
Novick received a B.A, magna cum laude from Yale and an MD with honors in Microbiology from NYU School of Medicine, performing his honors thesis research in the laboratory of Werner Maas on the biochemistry of leaky mutants in arginine biosynthesis in Escherichia coli, coining the term bradytroph as a descriptor. He interned at Yale-New Haven Hospital under Paul Beeson and performed post-doctoral research along with Mark Richmond in the Laboratory of Martin Pollock, at the National Institute for Medical Research in London, where he developed the micro-iodometric assay for beta-lactamase, and identified the first plasmid in S. aureus. Following a year as a resident in Medicine at Vanderbilt, under David Rogers, he returned to New York for a second post-doctoral, with Rollin Hotchkiss at the Rockefeller Institute, where he published a seminal paper on staphylococcal plasmids and then moved to the Public Health Research Institute of the City of New York (PHRI), . While at PHRI, he discovered heavy metal resistance in bacteria, showing that was carried by plasmids developed a set of molecular tools for the study of staphylococcal molecular genetics and schemes for the nomenclature of bacterial plasmids and transposons. At the 1975 Asilomar Conference on Recombinant DNA, he served as Chairman of the "plasmid group" ( with members Roy Clowes, Stan Cohen, Roy Curtiss, and Stanley Falkow), and wrote a major portion of the NIH Guidelines for Research with Recombinant DNA. In 1981 he succeeded George Hirst as Director of the Institute and, in 1993, moved to NYU School of Medicine, becoming the Recanati Family Professor of Science in 2010. There, he developed a cassette-based set of cloning vectors now in worldwide use, and over the years developed the world's largest collection of staphylococcal research strains (>12,000).

Novick has mentored 25 PhD students and 49 Post-doctorals, notably Saleem Khan and Emmanuelle Charpentier.

== Research ==
Novick's research has mainly been in the field of staphylococcal pathobiology. His mathematical analysis of plasmid incompatibility, in collaboration with Frank Hoppensteadt, was a major advance in plasmid biology as was his demonstration that plasmid replication initiator proteins are, de rigueur, used only once and then inactivated. At NYU, he discovered and characterized a key global regulator of staphylococcal virulence, the agr system of which the effector is RNAIII, and discovered a pathogenicity island family in the staphylococcal chromosome, now known as SaPIs, many of which encode toxic shock toxin. SaPIs turned out to be highly mobile and very widespread in staphylococci and to have a major role in horizontal gene transfer; his lab, led by Drs. Geeta Ram and Hope Ross, converted these mobile islands from agents of disease into antibacterial therapeutic agents (Antibacterial Drones (ABDs)), that could have a major role in the therapy of staphylococcal and other bacterial infections in this era of rampant antibiotic resistance. The ABD is indifferent to antibiotic resistance and is designed to avoid resistance. It acts by delivering to bacteria in an infection several bactericidal genes, which kill the bacteria and cure the infection. A patent on this technology has recently been issued, with Drs. Ram, Ross and Novick as joint inventors, and the Novick lab is currently working on commercialization; to achieve this, they have founded a biotech startup, ABD Therapeutics, Inc. which is actively seeking investment capital.

== Personal life ==
Novick is married to Barbara Zabin Novick, a retired neuropsychologist. They have two children, Lynn Novick, a documentary film maker and Dorothy Novick, a pediatrician and journalist, and 5 grandchildren.

Novick is a wood turner, a collector of Pre-Columbian figurines, a home brewer of apple cider and apple jack, a wild mushroom expert and a political activist, focusing primarily on the misuse of antibiotics in animal feed, a position for which he was profiled in The New Yorker. He and colleagues Roy Curtiss, Julian Davies and others resigned in protest from the CAST Task Force on Antibiotics in Feed, in 1979, and his prophetic paper, Antibiotics, Wonder Drugs or Chicken Feed, was published in The Sciences.
