= Germ theory of disease =

Prevailing theory about diseases

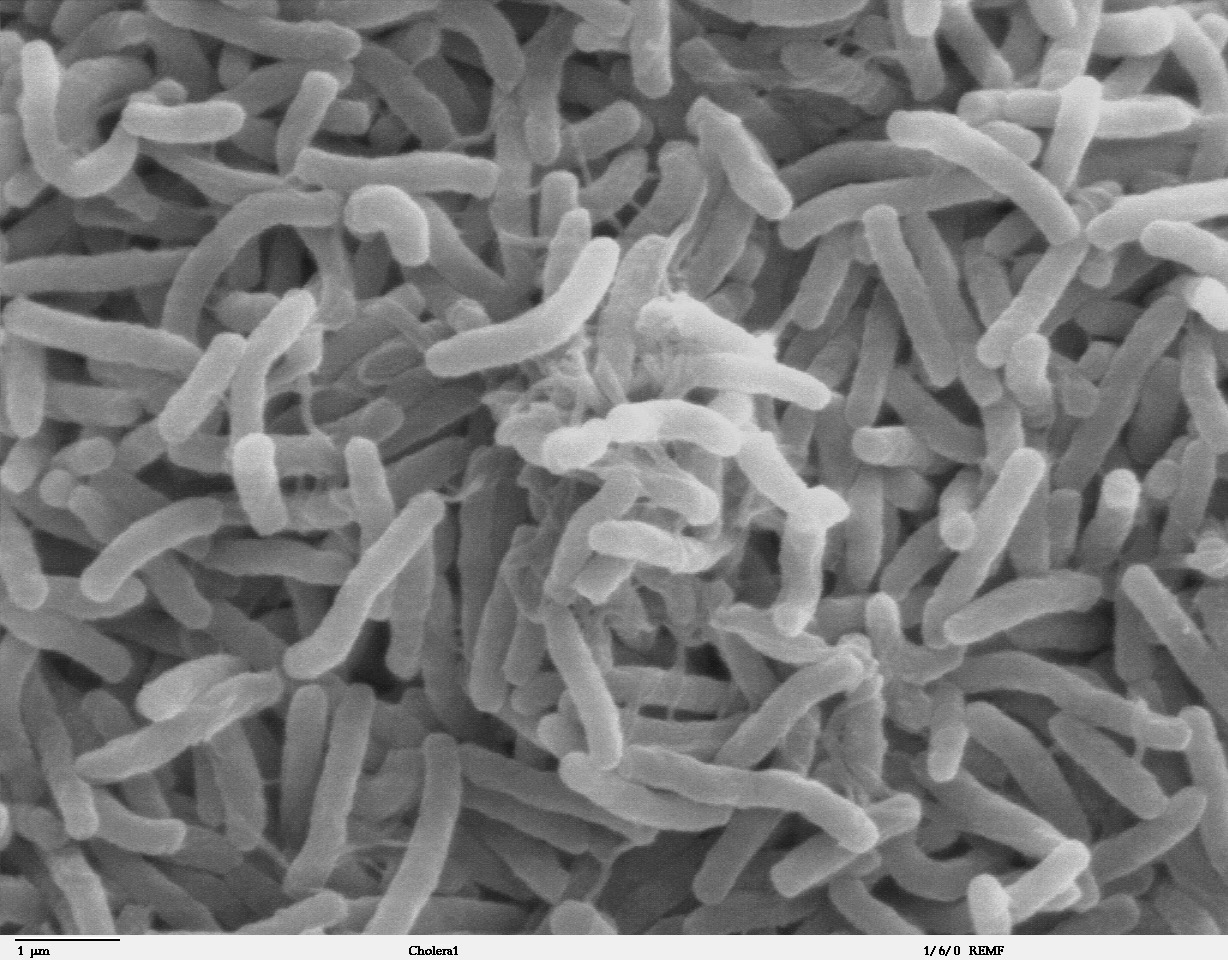
Scanning electron microscope image of Vibrio cholerae, the bacterium that causes cholera

The germ theory of disease is the currently accepted scientific theory explaining the cause of infectious diseases. It states that microorganisms known as pathogens or "germs" can cause disease. These small organisms, which are too small to be seen without magnification, invade animals, plants, and even bacteria. Their growth and reproduction within their hosts can cause disease. "Germ" refers not just to bacteria but to any type of microorganism, such as protists or fungi, or other pathogens, including parasites, viruses, prions, or viroids. Even when a pathogen is the principal cause of a disease, environmental and hereditary factors often influence the severity of the disease, and whether a potential host individual becomes infected when exposed to the pathogen. Pathogens are disease-causing agents that can pass from one individual to another, across multiple domains of life.

Basic forms of germ theory were proposed by Girolamo Fracastoro in 1546, and expanded upon by Marcus von Plenciz in 1762. However, such views were held in disdain in Europe, where Galen's miasma theory remained dominant among scientists and doctors.

By the early 19th century, the first vaccine, smallpox vaccination, was commonplace in Europe, though doctors were unaware of how it worked or how to extend the principle to other diseases. A transitional period began in the late 1850s with the work of Louis Pasteur. This work was later extended by Robert Koch in the 1880s. By the end of that decade, the miasma theory was struggling to compete with the germ theory of disease. Viruses were initially discovered in the 1890s. Eventually, a "golden era" of bacteriology ensued, during which the germ theory quickly led to the identification of the actual organisms that cause many diseases.

== Precursors ==
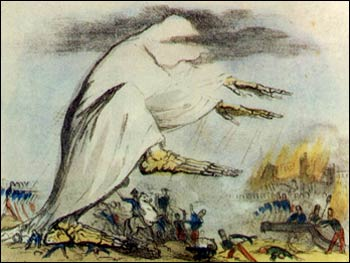
A representation by Robert Seymour of the cholera epidemic depicts the spread of the disease in the form of poisonous air.

Miasma theory was the predominant theory of disease transmission before the germ theory took hold towards the end of the 19th century; it is no longer accepted as a correct explanation for disease by the scientific community. It held that diseases such as cholera, chlamydia infection, or the Black Death were caused by a miasma (μίασμα, Ancient Greek: "pollution"), a noxious form of "bad air" emanating from rotting organic matter. Miasma was considered to be a poisonous vapor or mist filled with particles from decomposed matter (miasmata) that was identifiable by its foul smell. The theory posited that diseases were the product of environmental factors such as contaminated water, foul air, and poor hygienic conditions. Such infections, according to the theory, were not passed between individuals but would affect those within a locale that gave rise to such vapors.

=== Antiquity ===
In Antiquity, the Greek historian Thucydides (c. 460 – c. 400 BC) was the first known person to write, in his account of the plague of Athens, that diseases could spread from an infected person to others.

One theory of the spread of contagious diseases that were not spread by direct contact was that they were spread by spore-like "seeds" (Latin: semina) that were present in and dispersible through the air. In his poem, De rerum natura (On the Nature of Things, c. 56 BC), the Roman poet Lucretius (c. 99 BC – c. 55 BC) stated that the world contained various "seeds", some of which could sicken a person if they were inhaled or ingested.

The Roman statesman Marcus Terentius Varro (116–27 BC) wrote, in his Rerum rusticarum libri III (Three Books on Agriculture, 36 BC): "Precautions must also be taken in the neighborhood of swamps... because there are bred certain minute creatures which cannot be seen by the eyes, which float in the air and enter the body through the mouth and nose and there cause serious diseases."

The Greek physician Galen (AD 129 – c. 200/216) speculated in his On Initial Causes (c. 175 AD) that some patients might have "seeds of fever". In his On the Different Types of Fever (c. 175 AD), Galen speculated that plagues were spread by "certain seeds of plague", which were present in the air. And in his Epidemics (c. 176–178 AD), Galen explained that patients might relapse during recovery from fever because some "seed of the disease" lurked in their bodies, which would cause a recurrence of the disease if the patients did not follow a physician's therapeutic regimen.

=== Middle Ages ===
A hybrid form of miasma and contagion theory was proposed by Persian physician Ibn Sina (known as Avicenna in Europe) in The Canon of Medicine (1025). He mentioned that people can transmit disease to others by breath, noted contagion with tuberculosis, and discussed the transmission of disease through water and dirt.

During the early Middle Ages, Isidore of Seville (c. 560–636) mentioned "plague-bearing seeds" (pestifera semina) in his On the Nature of Things (c. AD 613). Later, in 1345, Tommaso del Garbo (c. 1305–1370) of Bologna, Italy mentioned Galen's "seeds of plague" in his work Commentaria non-parum utilia in libros Galeni (Helpful commentaries on the books of Galen).

The 16th century Reformer Martin Luther appears to have had some idea of the contagion theory, commenting, "I have survived three plagues and visited several people who had two plague spots which I touched. But it did not hurt me, thank God. Afterwards when I returned home, I took up Margaret," (born 1534), "who was then a baby, and put my unwashed hands on her face, because I had forgotten; otherwise I should not have done it, which would have been tempting God." In 1546, Italian physician Girolamo Fracastoro published De Contagione et Contagiosis Morbis (On Contagion and Contagious Diseases), a set of three books covering the nature of contagious diseases, categorization of major pathogens, and theories on preventing and treating these conditions. Fracastoro blamed "seeds of disease" that propagate through direct contact with an infected host, indirect contact with fomites, or through particles in the air.

=== Early Modern period ===
In 1668, Italian physician Francesco Redi published experimental evidence rejecting spontaneous generation, the theory that living creatures arise from nonliving matter. He observed that maggots only arose from rotting meat that was uncovered. When meat was left in jars covered by gauze, the maggots would instead appear on the gauze's surface, later understood as rotting meat's smell passing through the mesh to attract flies that laid eggs.

Microorganisms are said to have been first directly observed in the 1670s by Anton van Leeuwenhoek, an early pioneer in microbiology, considered "the Father of Microbiology". Leeuwenhoek is said to be the first to see and describe bacteria in 1674, yeast cells, the teeming life in a drop of water (such as algae), and the circulation of blood corpuscles in capillaries. The word "bacteria" did not exist yet, so he called these microscopic living organisms "animalcules", meaning "little animals". Those "very little animalcules" he was able to isolate from different sources, such as rainwater, pond and well water, and the human mouth and intestine.

Yet German Jesuit priest and scholar Athanasius Kircher (historically often misspelled as "Kirchner") may have observed such microorganisms prior to this. One of his books written in 1646 contains a chapter in Latin, which reads in translation: "Concerning the wonderful structure of things in nature, investigated by microscope...who would believe that vinegar and milk abound with an innumerable multitude of worms." Kircher defined the invisible organisms found in decaying bodies, meat, milk, and secretions as "worms." His studies with the microscope led him to the belief, which he was possibly the first to hold, that disease and putrefaction, or decay were caused by the presence of invisible living bodies, writing that "a number of things might be discovered in the blood of fever patients." When Rome was struck by the bubonic plague in 1656, Kircher investigated the blood of plague victims under the microscope. He noted the presence of "little worms" or "animalcules" in the blood and concluded that the disease was caused by microorganisms.

Kircher was the first to attribute infectious disease to a microscopic pathogen, inventing the germ theory of disease, which he outlined in his Scrutinium Physico-Medicum, published in Rome in 1658. Kircher's conclusion that disease was caused by microorganisms was correct, although it is likely that what he saw under the microscope were in fact red or white blood cells and not the plague agent itself. Kircher also proposed hygienic measures to prevent the spread of disease, such as isolation, quarantine, burning clothes worn by the infected, and wearing facemasks to prevent the inhalation of germs. It was Kircher who first proposed that living beings enter and exist in the blood.

In the 18th century, more proposals were made, but struggled to catch on. In 1700, physician Nicolas Andry argued that microorganisms he called "worms" were responsible for smallpox and other diseases. In 1720, Richard Bradley theorised that the plague and "all pestilential distempers" were caused by "poisonous insects", living creatures viewable only with the help of microscopes.

In 1762, the Austrian physician Marcus Antonius von Plenciz (1705–1786) published a book titled Opera medico-physica. It outlined a theory of contagion stating that specific animalcules in the soil and the air were responsible for causing specific diseases. Von Plenciz noted the distinction between diseases which are both epidemic and contagious (like measles and dysentery), and diseases which are contagious but not epidemic (like rabies and leprosy). The book cites Anton van Leeuwenhoek to show how ubiquitous such animalcules are and was unique for describing the presence of germs in ulcerating wounds. Ultimately, the theory espoused by von Plenciz was not accepted by the scientific community.

== Development ==
=== Agostino Bassi, Italy ===
During the early 19th century, driven by economic concerns over collapsing silk production, Italian entomologist Agostino Bassi researched a silkworm disease known as "muscardine" in French and "calcinaccio" or "mal del segno" in Italian, causing white fungal spots along the caterpillar. From 1835 to 1836, Bassi published his findings that fungal spores transmitted the disease between individuals. In recommending the rapid removal of diseased caterpillars and disinfection of their surfaces, Bassi outlined methods used in modern preventative healthcare. Italian naturalist Giuseppe Gabriel Balsamo-Crivelli named the causative fungal species after Bassi, currently classified as Beauveria bassiana.

=== Louis-Daniel Beauperthuy, France ===
In 1838 French specialist in tropical medicine Louis-Daniel Beauperthuy pioneered using microscopy in relation to diseases and independently developed a theory that all infectious diseases were due to parasitic infection with "animalcules" (microorganisms). With the help of his friend M. Adele de Rosseville, he presented his theory in a formal presentation before the French Academy of Sciences in Paris. By 1853, he was convinced that malaria and yellow fever were spread by mosquitos. He even identified the particular group of mosquitos that transmit yellow fever as the "domestic species" of "striped-legged mosquito", which can be recognised as Aedes aegypti, the actual vector. He published his theory in 1854 in the Gaceta Oficial de Cumana ("Official Gazette of Cumana"). His reports were assessed by an official commission, which discarded his mosquito theory.

=== Ignaz Semmelweis, Austria ===
Ignaz Semmelweis, a Hungarian obstetrician working at the Vienna General Hospital (Allgemeines Krankenhaus) in 1847, noticed the dramatically high maternal mortality from puerperal fever following births assisted by doctors and medical students. However, those attended by midwives were relatively safe. Investigating further, Semmelweis made the connection between puerperal fever and examinations of delivering women by doctors, and further realized that these physicians had usually come directly from autopsies. Asserting that puerperal fever was a contagious disease and that matter from autopsies was implicated in its spread, Semmelweis made doctors wash their hands with chlorinated lime water before examining pregnant women. He then documented a sudden reduction in the mortality rate from 18% to 2.2% over a period of a year. Despite this evidence, he and his theories were rejected by most of the contemporary medical establishment.

=== Gideon Mantell, UK ===
Gideon Mantell, the Sussex doctor more famous for discovering dinosaur fossils, spent time with his microscope, and speculated in his Thoughts on Animalcules (1850) that perhaps "many of the most serious maladies which afflict humanity, are produced by peculiar states of invisible animalcular life".

=== John Snow, UK ===
British physician John Snow is credited as a founder of modern epidemiology for studying the 1854 Broad Street cholera outbreak. Snow criticized the Italian anatomist Giovanni Maria Lancisi for his early 18th century writings that claimed swamp miasma spread malaria, rebutting that bad air from decomposing organisms was not present in all cases. In his 1849 pamphlet On the Mode of Communication of Cholera, Snow proposed that cholera spread through the fecal–oral route, replicating in human lower intestines.

In the book's second edition, published in 1855, Snow theorized that cholera was caused by cells smaller than human epithelial cells, leading to Robert Koch's 1884 confirmation of the bacterial species Vibrio cholerae as the causative agent. In recognizing a biological origin, Snow recommended boiling and filtering water, setting the precedent for modern boil-water advisory directives.

Through a statistical analysis tying cholera cases to specific water pumps associated with the Southwark and Vauxhall Waterworks Company, which supplied sewage-polluted water from the River Thames, Snow showed that areas supplied by this company experienced fourteen times as many deaths as residents using Lambeth Waterworks Company pumps that obtained water from the upriver, cleaner Seething Wells. While Snow received praise for convincing the Board of Guardians of St James's Parish to remove the handles of contaminated pumps, he noted that the outbreak's cases were already declining as scared residents fled the region.

=== Louis Pasteur, France ===
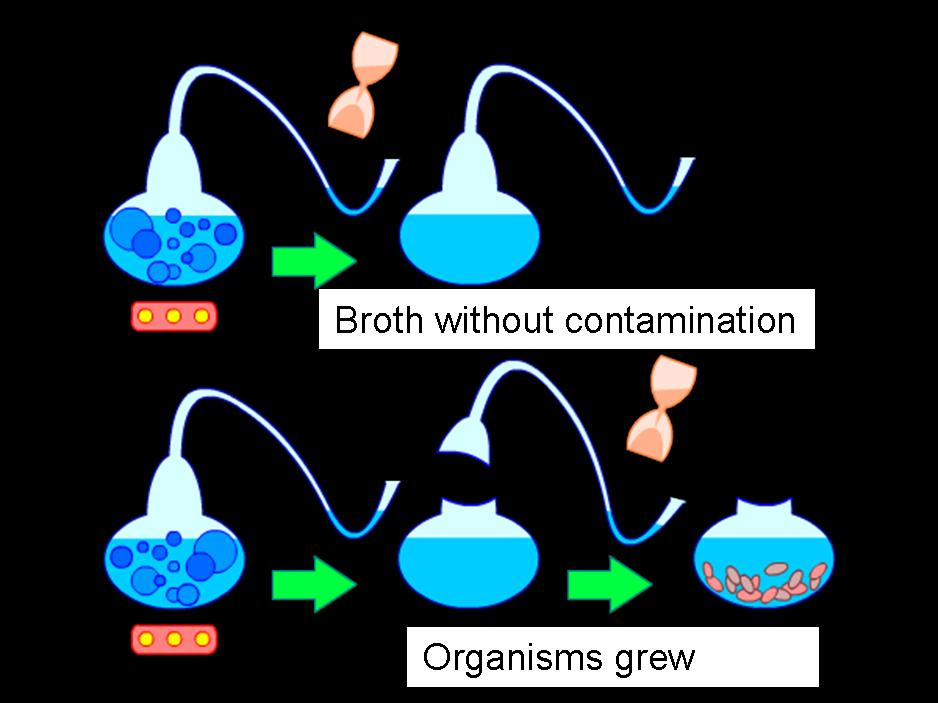
Louis Pasteur's spontaneous generation experiment illustrates that liquid nutrients are spoiled by particles in the air rather than the air itself. These results of these experiments supported the germ theory of disease.

During the mid-19th century, French microbiologist Louis Pasteur showed that treating the female genital tract with boric acid killed the microorganisms causing postpartum infections while avoiding damage to mucous membranes.

Building on Redi's work, Pasteur disproved spontaneous generation by constructing swan neck flasks containing nutrient broth. Since the flask contents were only fermented when in direct contact with the external environment's air by removing the curved tubing, Pasteur demonstrated that bacteria must travel between sites of infection to colonize environments.

Similar to Bassi, Pasteur extended his research on germ theory by studying pébrine, a disease that causes brown spots on silkworms. While Swiss botanist Carl Nägeli discovered the fungal species Nosema bombycis in 1857, Pasteur applied the findings to recommend improved ventilation and screening of silkworm eggs, an early form of disease surveillance.

=== Robert Koch, Germany ===
In 1884, German bacteriologist Robert Koch published four criteria for establishing causality between specific microorganisms and diseases, now known as Koch's postulates:

1. The microorganism must be found in abundance in all organisms with the disease, but should not be found in healthy organisms.
2. The microorganism must be isolated from a diseased organism and grown in pure culture.
3. The cultured microorganism should cause disease when introduced into a healthy organism.
4. The microorganism must be re-isolated from the inoculated, diseased experimental host and identified as being identical to the original specific causative agent.

During his lifetime, Koch recognized that the postulates were not universally applicable, such as asymptomatic carriers of cholera violating the first postulate. For this same reason, the third postulate specifies "should", rather than "must", because not all host organisms exposed to an infectious agent will acquire the infection, potentially due to differences in prior exposure to the pathogen. Limiting the second postulate, it was later discovered that viruses cannot be grown in pure cultures because they are obligate intracellular parasites, making it impossible to fulfill the second postulate. Similarly, pathogenic misfolded proteins, known as prions, only spread by transmitting their structure to other proteins, rather than self-replicating.

While Koch's postulates retain historical importance for emphasizing that correlation does not imply causation, many pathogens are accepted as causative agents of specific diseases without fulfilling all of the criteria. In 1988, American microbiologist Stanley Falkow published a molecular version of Koch's postulates to establish correlation between microbial genes and virulence factors.

=== Joseph Lister, UK ===
After reading Pasteur's papers on bacterial fermentation, British surgeon Joseph Lister recognized that compound fractures, involving bones breaking through the skin, were more likely to become infected due to exposure to environmental microorganisms. He recognized that carbolic acid could be applied to the site of injury as an effective antiseptic.

== See also ==
- Alexander Fleming
- Cell theory
- Cooties
- Epidemiology
- Chronic diseases and cancers linked to infectious microbes
- Germ theory denialism
- History of emerging infectious diseases
- History of public health in the United Kingdom
- Miasma theory
- Robert Hooke
- Rudolf Virchow
- Zymotic disease
