= IsrM small RNA =

IsrM sRNA
- Predicted secondary structure and sequence conservation of IsrM small RNA

Identifiers
- Rfam: RF02763

Other data
- Domain(s): Bacteria
- GO: GO:0009405,GO:0040033
- SO: SO:0000370
- PDB structures: PDBe

The IsrM RNA is a small non-coding RNA discovered in Salmonella enterica pathogenicity island, which is not found in E. coli. It is important for invasion of epithelial cells, intracellular replication inside macrophages, virulence and colonisation in mice. It targets the SopA and HilE mRNAs, virulence factors essential for bacterial invasion. It is a first pathogenicity island-encoded sRNA shown to be directly involved in Salmonella pathogenesis.
