= NSAPI =

NSAPI may refer to:

- Netscape Server Application Programming Interface, a technology for extending web server software
- Network Service Access Point Identifier, an identifier used in cellular data networks

== See also ==
- NPAPI, Netscape Plugin Application Programming Interface
