= Mary O'Riordan =

American molecular biologist

Mary X. D. O’Riordan
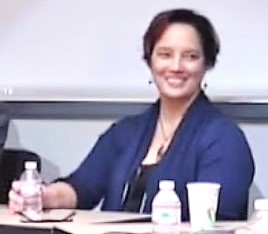
- O'Riordan in 2015
- Education: University of California, San Francisco; Princeton University; University of Washington
- Scientific career
- Workplaces: University of California, Berkeley; University of Michigan
- Thesis: Transcriptional control of early B cell differentiation (1999)

Mary X. D. O’Riordan is an American molecular biologist who is the Frederick C. Neidhardt Collegiate Professor of Microbiology and Immunology at the University of Michigan. She also serves as Dean for Graduate and Postdoctoral Studies at Michigan Medicine.

== Early life and education ==
O'Riordan earned an undergraduate degree in biology from the University of Washington and an M.A. in molecular biology from Princeton University, then joined the University of California, San Francisco as a doctoral researcher. Her research considered early B cell differentiation. After earning her doctorate, O'Riordan moved to the University of California, Berkeley as a postdoctoral fellow.

== Research and career ==
In 2003, O'Riordan joined the faculty at the University of Michigan. O'Riordan studies the interactions of bacterial pathogens with their hosts, and innate immune responses to bacterial infection. She is particularly interested in the mechanisms that underpin how the Gram-positive bacterium Listeria monocytogenes interacts with the cellular environment. She is also interested in how the pathogens regulate infection.

O'Riordan discovered the endoplasmic reticulum becomes stressed during lupus, which activates ERN1. ERN1 released neutrophil extracellular traps from lupus neutrophils, which trigger autoantibody formation and contribute to blood vessel clotting.

== Academic service ==
O'Riordan was inducted into the University of Michigan Medical School League of Educational Excellence in 2013. In 2014, O'Riordan was named a Kavli Foundation fellow. In June 2015, O'Riordan was appointed Dean of Graduate & Postdoctoral Studies at the University of Michigan Medical School. She was named the Frederick C. Neidhardt Collegiate Professor in 2018.

== Selected publications ==
- T. Reya; M. O'Riordan; R. Okamura; E. Devaney; K. Willert; R. Nusse; R. Grosschedl (1 July 2000). "Wnt signaling regulates B lymphocyte proliferation through a LEF-1 dependent mechanism". Immunity. 13 (1): 15–24. doi:10.1016/s1074-7613(00)00004-2. ISSN 1074-7613. PMID 10933391. Wikidata Q28585177.
- Victoria Auerbuch; Dirk G Brockstedt; Nicole Meyer-Morse; Mary O'Riordan; Daniel A Portnoy (9 August 2004). "Mice lacking the type I interferon receptor are resistant to Listeria monocytogenes". Journal of Experimental Medicine. 200 (4): 527–533. doi:10.1084/jem.20040976. ISSN 0022-1007. PMC 2211930. PMID 15302899. Wikidata Q36399578.
- M O'Riordan; R Grosschedl (1 July 1999). "Coordinate regulation of B cell differentiation by the transcription factors EBF and E2A". Immunity. 11 (1): 21–31. doi:10.1016/s1074-7613(00)80078-3. ISSN 1074-7613. PMID 10435576. Wikidata Q40937465.
