= Koch's postulates =

Four criteria showing a causal relationship between a causative microbe and a disease

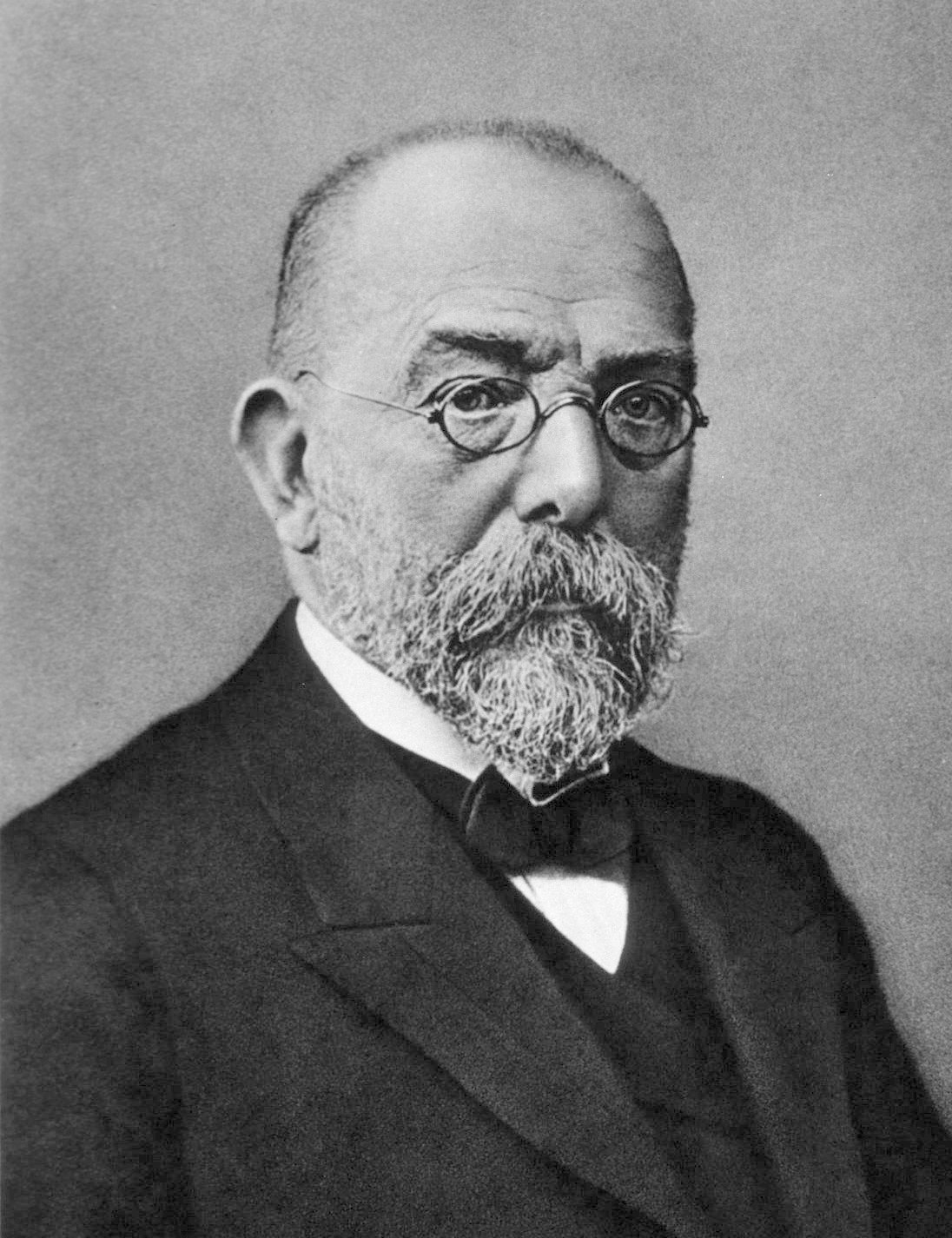
Robert Hermann Koch (11 December 1843 – 27 May 1910) was a German physician who developed Koch's postulates.

Koch's postulates (/kɒx/ KOKH) are four criteria designed to establish a causal relationship between a microbe and a disease. The postulates were formulated by Robert Koch and Friedrich Loeffler in 1884, based on earlier concepts described by Jakob Henle, and the statements were refined and published by Koch in 1890. Koch applied the postulates to describe the etiology of cholera and tuberculosis, both of which are now ascribed to bacteria. The postulates have been controversially generalized to other diseases. More modern concepts in microbial pathogenesis cannot be examined using Koch's postulates, including viruses (which are obligate intracellular parasites) and asymptomatic carriers. They have largely been supplanted by other criteria such as the Bradford Hill criteria for infectious disease causality in modern public health and molecular Koch's postulates for microbial pathogenesis. Modified Koch's postulates also have been proposed for infectious proteins such as prions.

== Postulates ==
Koch's postulates of disease.

Koch's four postulates are:

1. The microorganism must be found in abundance in all organisms suffering from the disease but should not be found in healthy organisms.
2. The microorganism must be isolated from a diseased organism and grown in pure culture.
3. The cultured microorganism should cause disease when introduced into a healthy organism.
4. The microorganism must be re-isolated from the inoculated, diseased experimental host and identified as being identical to the original specific causative agent. (Note: The fourth postulate was added later)

However, Koch later abandoned the universalist requirement of the first postulate when he discovered asymptomatic carriers of cholera and, later, of typhoid fever. Subclinical infections and asymptomatic carriers are now known to be a common feature of many infectious diseases, especially viral diseases such as polio, herpes simplex, HIV/AIDS, hepatitis C, and COVID-19. For example, poliovirus only causes paralysis in a small percentage of those infected.

The second postulate does not apply to pathogens incapable of growing in pure culture. For example, viruses are dependent on entering and hijacking host cells to use their resources for growth and reproduction, incapable of growing alone.

The third postulate specifies "should", rather than "must", because Koch's experiments with tuberculosis and cholera showed that not all organisms exposed to an infectious agent will acquire the infection. Some individuals may avoid infection by maintaining their health for proper immune functioning, acquiring immunity from previous exposure or vaccination, or through genetic immunity, such as sickle cell trait conferring resistance to malaria.

Other exceptions to Koch's postulates include evidence that some pathogens can cause several diseases, such as the varicella-zoster virus causing chickenpox and shingles. Conversely, diseases like meningitis can be caused by a variety of bacterial, viral, fungal, and parasitic pathogens.

== History ==
Robert Koch developed the postulates based on pathogens that could be isolated using 19th century methods. Nonetheless, Koch was already aware that the causative agent of cholera, Vibrio cholerae, could be found in both sick and healthy people, invalidating his first postulate. Since the 1950s, Koch's postulates have been treated as obsolete for epidemiology research, but they are still taught to emphasize historical approaches to determining the microbial causative agents of disease.

Koch formulated his postulates too early in the history of virology to recognize that many viruses do not cause illness in all infected individuals, a requirement of the first postulate. HIV/AIDS denialism includes claims that the viral spread of HIV/AIDS violates Koch's second postulate, despite that criticism being applicable to all viruses. Nonetheless, HIV/AIDS fulfills all of the other postulates with all AIDS patients being HIV-positive and laboratory workers exposed to HIV eventually developing the same symptoms of AIDS. Similarly, evidence that some oncovirus infections can contribute to cancers has been unfairly criticized for failing to fulfill criteria developed before viruses were fully understood as host-dependent.

The bacterial pathogen Staphylococcus aureus showcases lethal synergy with the opportunistic fungi Candida albicans by using the latter's extracellular matrix to protect itself from host immune cells and antibiotic compounds. Biofilm-producing species aim to clump individual cells on solid or liquid surfaces, growing poorly in a pure culture and leaving those that survive potentially too weak to cause disease if transferred to a healthy organism, violating the second and third postulates.

Physicians Barry Marshall and Robin Warren argued that Helicobacter pylori contributes to peptic ulcer disease, but throughout the early 1980s, the scientific community initially rejected their findings because not all H. pylori infections cause peptic ulcers, violating the first postulate.

Priority effects are another major concern, as the success of pathogenic bacteria is dependent on the other species already colonizing that habitat, as the earliest resident microbes establish the environmental conditions, providing colonization resistance against certain species.

== Molecular Koch's postulates ==
In 1988, microbiologist Stanley Falkow developed a set of three Molecular Koch's postulates for identifying the microbial genes encoding virulence factors. First, the phenotype of a disease symptom must be associated with a specific genotype only found in pathogenic strains. Second, that symptom should not be present when the associated gene is inactivated. Third, the symptom should return when the gene is reactivated.

Modern DNA sequencing allows researchers to identify whether the genes of specific pathogens are only present in infected hosts, offering a modified approach for determining correlation between viruses and certain diseases. Since viruses cannot grow in axenic cultures, requiring a host cell to hijack for growth and replication, scientists are limited to analyzing which viral genes contribute to host diseases. Additionally, this method has supported correlations between prions (pathogenic misfolded proteins) and conditions like Creutzfeldt–Jakob disease because Koch's postulates are focused on foreign microorganisms, rather than the results of host mutations.

== See also ==
- Bradford Hill criteria
- Causal inference
- Molecular Koch's postulates
