= PinT small RNA =

PinT sRNA
- Predicted secondary structure and sequence conservation of PinT small RNA

Identifiers
- Rfam: RF01404

Other data
- Domain: Bacteria
- SO: SO:0001263
- PDB structures: PDBe

In bacteria, PinT small RNA is a small regulatory RNA (sRNA) that is activated during stress and virulence conditions. sRNAs base-pair with target mRNAs and modulate their stability or translation. The expression of PhoP-activated sRNA called PinT is highly induced during Salmonella enterica infection. PinT temporally controls Salmonella virulence genes. On bacterial internalization it controls the expression of invasion associated effectors (SPI-1) through the direct base-pairing with the mRNA. Later in infection it represses the virulence genes (SPI-2) allowing the switch from an invasive state to the state of intracellular replication.
