= Propionate kinase =

Identifiers
- EC no.: 2.7.2.15
- CAS no.: 39369-28-3

Databases
- BRENDA: enzyme data
- ExPASy: NiceZyme view
- KEGG: enzyme entry
- MetaCyc: metabolic pathway
- Rhea: reactions
- PDB structures: RCSB PDB PDBe PDBsum
Search
- PMC: articles
- PubMed: articles
- NCBI: proteins

Propionate kinase (EC 2.7.2.15, PduW, TdcD, propionate/acetate kinase) is an enzyme with systematic name ATP:propanoate phosphotransferase. It catalyses the following reversible chemical reaction

ATP +
propionic acid
ADP +
propanoyl phosphate

The enzyme characterised from Escherichia coli requires magnesium ion (Mg^{2+}) and converts propionic acid to propanoyl phosphate by transferring a phosphate group from the cofactor, adenosine triphosphate (ATP), which is converted to adenosine diphosphate (ADP). The reaction is part of a sequence which degrades the amino acid L-threonine to propionic acid. The enzyme is also found in Salmonella enterica, which allows that bacterium to grow on propylene glycol. It can also act on acetic acid.

== Structural studies ==
X-ray crystallography has been used to determine the structure of the enzyme from Salmonella typhimurium.
