= Denise M. Monack =

American microbiologist

- Education: University of California, Davis; Stanford University
- Scientific career
- Fields: Microbiology
- Workplaces: Stanford University
- Thesis: Bacterial pathogens exploit normal host cell processes to cause gastrointestinal disease (2002)
- Doctoral advisor: Stanley Falkow

Denise M. Monack is an American microbiologist who is the Martha Meier Weiland Professor and chair of the department of microbiology and immunology at the Stanford University School of Medicine.

== Life ==
Monack earned a B.S. in genetics from the University of California, Davis in 1984. She completed a Ph.D. in microbiology and immunology from Stanford University School of Medicine in 2002. Her dissertation was titled, Bacterial Pathogens Exploit Normal Host Cell Processes to Cause Gastrointestinal Disease.

From 1984 to 1998, Monack worked in the laboratory of Stanley Falkow at Stanford University, first as a life science technician and later as a research assistant. She was promoted to assistant professor in 2008, associate professor in 2012, and professor in 2016. In 2015, she was elected a fellow of the American Academy of Microbiology. In 2022, Monack became the Martha Meier Weiland Professor and chair of the department of microbiology and immunology.
