= Kelly Ten Hagen =

American glycobiologist

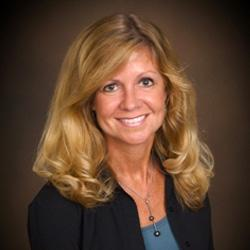
- Born: Kelly E. Greig
- Education: Cornell University (Bs); Stanford University (PhD)
- Awards: Rosalind Kornfeld Award for Lifetime Achievement in Glycobiology
- Scientific career
- Fields: Developmental glycobiology
- Workplaces: National Institute of Dental and Craniofacial Research
- Doctoral advisor: Stanley Norman Cohen

Kelly Greig Ten Hagen is an American glycobiologist and head of the developmental glycobiology section at the National Institute of Dental and Craniofacial Research. She studies O-glycosylation regulation and its relationship to human disease.

== Life ==
Kelly E. Greig received a B.S. from Cornell University with distinction and honors and earned a Ph.D. in genetics at Stanford University. Her 1992 dissertation was titled Studies investigating the temporal order of NDA replication in mammalian cells. Stanley Norman Cohen was her doctoral advisor.

Ten Hagen is the associate scientific director and head of the developmental glycobiology section at the National Institute of Dental and Craniofacial Research (NIDCR). Her lab studies the enzyme family and factors that regulate protein O-glycosylation and how this conserved protein modification influences organ development and function, to better understand how aberrations contribute to disease.

Ten Hagen has served as an editorial board member for the Journal of Biological Chemistry and currently serves on the editorial board for Glycobiology, the board of reviewing editors for eLife and as a council member for the American Society for Biochemistry and Molecular Biology (ASBMB). She is a founding member of the Women in Biochemistry and Molecular Biology Committee within the ASBMB. Ten Hagen is an elected Fellow of the American Association for the Advancement of Science and was the co-recipient of the 2019 NIH Equity, Diversity and Inclusion Award of the year. She currently serves on the NIH Central Tenure Committee, the NIH Anti-Harassment Steering Committee and the NIH Women Scientists Advisors Committee.
