= Marcus Antonius Plencic =

Slovenian physician and proponent of germ theory

Marko Anton Plenčič, Marcus von Plenciz or Marcus Antonius von Plenciz (28 April 1705 – 25 November 1786) was a Slovenian physician in Vienna who was among the early adopters of the germ or contagion theory of infection at a time when infectious disease was attributed to bad air or miasmas. He published his theories in Opera medico-physica 1762. He has been called the Slovene Pasteur.

Plenčič was born in Salcan near Görtz/Gorizia where he studied before going to study medicine in Vienna and Padua. Graduating in 1735, he practiced in Vienna until his death. His 1762 book Opera medico-physica had four parts and he described the theory of germs that he called animalcula minima or animalcula insensibilia as being the cause of infectious diseases with his focus being on rinderpest. Among his teachers was Carlo Francesco Cogrossi (1682–1769) who had also identified microbes as causal organisms for disease. Plenčič suggested that earthquakes such as the one in 1755 had helped the spread of rinderpest. He hypothesized that each disease was caused by a different organism dwelling within the human body, but was unable to offer proof. He suggested treatments that worked against the microbes as cures although the agents he suggested were antiseptics and heavy metal compounds. He was an honorary professor at the Vienna Medical School and was titled as a nobleman by Maria Theresa in 1764 and knighted in 1770.
