= PSC101 =

DNA plasmid used as a cloning vector

pSC101 is a plasmid that is used as a cloning vector in molecular biology. pSC101 was the first cloning vector, used in 1973 by Herbert Boyer and Stanley Norman Cohen. Using this plasmid they have demonstrated that a gene from a frog could be transferred into bacterial cells and then expressed by the bacterial cells. The plasmid is a natural plasmid from Salmonella panama.

== History ==
In the early 1970s, Herbert Boyer and Stanley Norman Cohen produced pSC101, the first plasmid vector for cloning purposes. Soon after successfully cloning two pSC101 plasmids together to create one large plasmid, they published the results describing the experiment, in 1973. The cloning of genes into plasmids occurred soon after. In 1980, pSC101 became the first patented commercial DNA cloning vector when patents were awarded to Boyer and Cohen. The "SC" stands for Stanley Cohen. Although the original pSC101 only contained tetracycline resistance and a restriction site for EcoRI, the commercially available pSC101 gained restriction sites for several enzymes, including HindIII, in addition to the EcoRI site.

== Usage ==
Certain mutants of the pSC101 replication protein RepA are heat sensitive and can not stably maintain the plasmid in bacteria when grown at temperatures above 37C. This property can be used to "cure" bacteria transformed with plasmids using the pSC101 origin of replication by growing them at an elevated temperature, typically 42C.
