= AsrC small RNA =

AsrC sRNA
- Predicted secondary structure and sequence conservation of antisense RNA of rseC mRNA

Identifiers
- Rfam: RF02746

Other data
- Domain(s): Bacteria
- GO: GO:0071977,GO:0010628
- SO: SO:0000370
- PDB structures: PDBe

AsrC (Antisense RNA of rseC) is a cis-encoded antisense RNA of rseC (an activator gene of sigma factor RpoE) described in Salmonella enterica serovar Typhi. It was discovered by deep sequencing and its transcription was confirmed by Northern blot. AsrC is an 893 bp sequence that covers all of the rseC coding region in the reverse direction of transcription. It increases the level of rseC mRNA and protein, indirectly activating RpoE. RpoE can promote flagellar gene expression and motility. Coincidentally, expression of AsrC increased bacterial swimming motility. it is possible that it is because AsrC is promoting the expression of genes related to motility.
