= Louis-Daniel Beauperthuy =

French physician

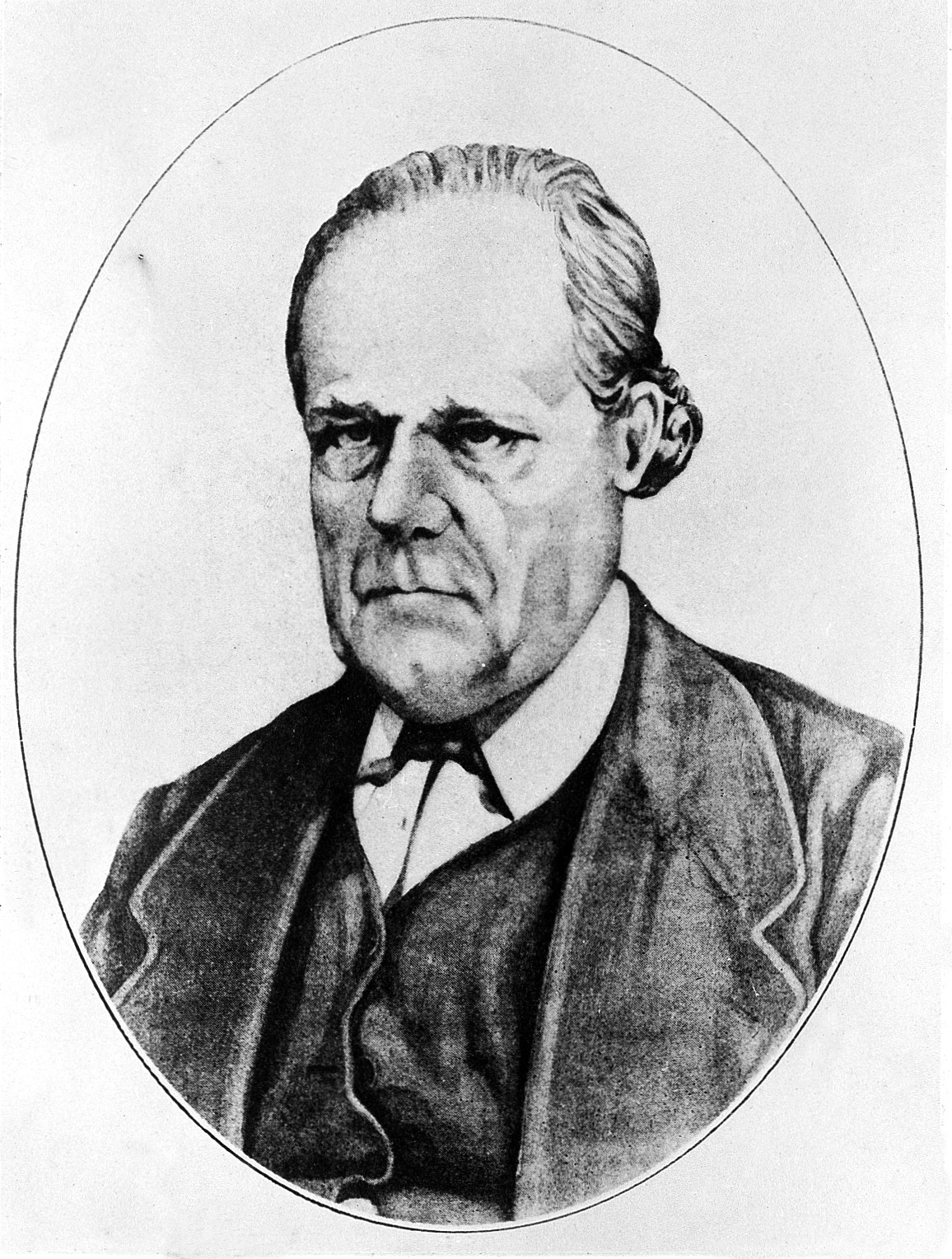
- Born: 25 August 1808; Basse-Terre, Guadeloupe, France
- Died: 3 September 1871 (aged 63)
- Resting place: Mazaruni River, Guiana
- Citizenship: French
- Education: Paris Faculty of Medicine
- Known for: Etiology of infectious diseases
- Scientific career
- Fields: Tropical disease

Louis-Daniel Beauperthuy (25 August 1808 (Note: The date of birth is variously recorded; Sakula (1986) gives 26 August 1807; the gravestone has an inscription "aged 69 years" indicating the birth year as 1802; Agramonte's date 25 August 1808 may be most reliable.) – 3 September 1871) was a French medical doctor who made important contributions to the study of the causes of infectious diseases such as yellow fever, malaria, cholera and leprosy. He was the first in Europe to systematically argue that malaria and yellow fever were transmitted by mosquitos.

== Biography ==
Beauperthuy was born in Basse-Terre, Guadeloupe, an archipelago in the Caribbean, where his father Pierre Daniel Beauperthuy was a physician. He was the second of six siblings. He studied medicine at the Paris Faculty of Medicine, and obtained his M.D. in 1837. His thesis was titled De la Climatologie (Of the Climatology). He was immediately appointed by the Paris Museum of Natural History as a "Travelling Naturalist" to work in Orinoco, Venezuela. His primary duty was to study the prevalent diseases in the area. He was one of the earliest scientists to observe microorganism using microscopy in relation to diseases.

In 1838 he independently developed a theory that all infectious diseases were due to parasitic infection with "animalcules" (microorganisms). With the help of his friend Adele de Rosseville, he presented his theory in a formal presentation before the French Academy of Sciences in Paris. He suspected that mosquitos were the carriers of the infectious pathogens, including those of leprosy. He noted:

The patients should live in as healthy a locality as possible, and not in the neighbourhood of marshes, etc. They are required to sleep under mosquito nets so as to prevent the sting of insects, which irritate and inflame the skin and perhaps propagate the disease.

In 1841, he went on an expedition to Cumaná, where he met a Venezuelan woman Ignacia Sánchez Mayz, who he married the next year. In 1842 he joined the Facultad Médica de Caracas (Faculty of Caracas Medical School). The medical school awarded him an M.D. degree in 1844 to get a qualification in tropical disease. In 1850, he became a professor of anatomy at the School of Medicine of the College of Cumaná.

Although Beauperthuy believed that leprosy was an insect-borne disease, a method of treatment he developed in the late 1860s was effective, and his service became greatly demanded. In early 1870, he was invited to test his treatment method at Trinidad, and was requested to remain there. British colonial officers heard of his works and arranged his service at Guyana (the British Guiana), where leprosy was rampant. In August 1870, Beauperthuy arrived at Kaow Island where the British government was establishing a hospital for leprosy. He became the Director of the Leper Hospital in Demerara, the post he held till his death. His treatment method was found to be a failure.

Beauperthuy died in Kaow Island, as The Colonist reported:

It is with extreme regret that we announce the sudden death from apoplexy of Dr. Beauperthuy at the Leper Establishment on Kaow Island, where he was engaged in the development of his system for the cure of leprosy. We understand that the doctor was sleeping in his hammock when his stertorous breathing attracted the attention of Madame Beauperthuy, the wife of his nephew, M. Jules Beauperthuy, who resided with him. She attempted to arouse the doctor but without effect; in a few minutes he died without having rallied or spoken.

Beauperthuy was interred at Bartica Grove cemetery. When the Governor of Guyana John Scott learned of the burial, he ordered the body to be exhumed and given proper official funeral. The funeral service was led by the Governor and the Chief Justice in the presence of all officials of Guyana. He was buried at the Officers' Cemetery at the H.M.S. Penal Settlement on the banks of Mazaruni River.

== Scientific contributions ==
Following an earthquake in 1853 in Cumaná, there were outbreaks of yellow fever, smallpox and cholera. Beauperthuy was appointed to make investigations. His report in 1855 in the Gaceta Oficial de Cumana (Official Gazette of Cumana) indicates that he had detected motile pathogens from the stool samples of cholera patients. (The exact pathogen, a bacterium (Vibrio cholerae), was identified by German biologist Robert Koch in 1884.) His report also mentions that yellow fever was caused by a virus which he called "vegeto-animal" that was transmitted by mosquitos. This was the first observation that a disease such as yellow fever was caused by germs and transmitted by insects.

He even identified the particular group of mosquitos that transmit yellow fever as the "domestic species" of "striped-legged mosquito", which can be recognised as Aedes aegypti, the actual vector. However, the medical community rejected the discovery in preference to the prevailing miasmatic doctrine of diseases. His reports were assessed by an official commission, which discarded his mosquito theory. Ronald Ross, the 1902 Nobel Prize winner for the discovery of malarial transmission, wrote: "I did not think his [Beauperthuy's] contributions to the subject of insect-borne diseases were of sufficient importance.

== Legacy ==
A hospital in Basse-Terre, called the Centre hospitalier Louis-Daniel Beauperthuy, was established in 1959 in his honour.

== See also ==
- Mosquito-malaria theory
