= Stanley Falkow =

American microbiologist (1934–2018)

Stanley Falkow FRS
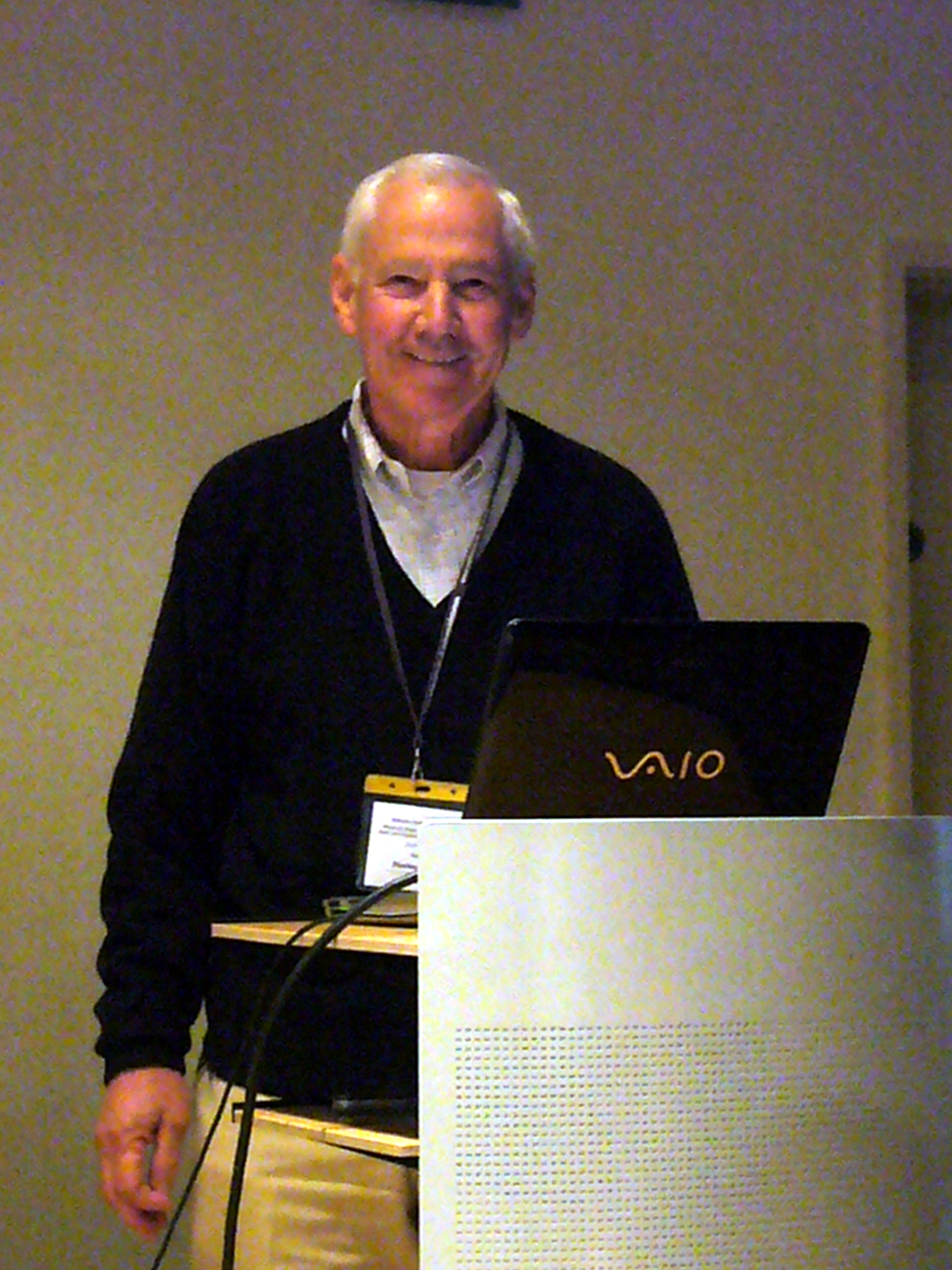
- Born: January 24, 1934; Albany, New York
- Died: May 5, 2018 (aged 84); Portola Valley, California
- Education: University of Maine; Brown University
- Occupations: Technician, Newport Hospital (1956–1957); Scientist, Walter Reed Army Institute of Research (1961–1966); Professor, Georgetown University (1967–1972); Professor, University of Washington (1972–1981); Professor, Stanford University (1981–2018)
- Known for: Antibiotic resistance and molecular microbiology research
- Partner(s): Rhoda Ostroff (m.1958–1983); Lucy S. Tompkins (m. 1983–2018)
- Children: 2
- Awards: Robert Koch Prize; Marjory Stephenson Prize; Paul Ehrlich and Ludwig Darmstaedter Prize; Howard Taylor Ricketts Award; National Medal of Science
- Scientific career
- Thesis: An episomic element in a strain of Salmonella typhosa (1960)
- Doctoral advisor: Charles ("Doc") Arthur Stuart, Brown University

Stanley "Stan" Falkow (January 24, 1934 – May 5, 2018) was an American microbiologist and a professor of microbiology at Georgetown University, University of Washington, and Stanford University School of Medicine. Falkow is known as the father of the field of molecular microbial pathogenesis. He formulated molecular Koch's postulates, which have guided the study of the microbial determinants of infectious diseases since the late 1980s. Falkow spent over 50 years uncovering molecular mechanisms of how bacteria cause disease and how to disarm them. Falkow also was one of the first scientists to investigate antimicrobial resistance, and presented his research extensively to scientific, government, and lay audiences explaining the spread of resistance from one organism to another, now known as horizontal gene transfer, and the implications of this phenomenon on our ability to combat infections in the future.

== Early life and education ==
Falkow was born into a Yiddish-speaking household in Albany, New York. His father was a shoe salesman and had immigrated from Soviet Kyiv, Ukraine. His mother came from a family of Jewish immigrants from Poland. She "rented several of their bedrooms and later opened a corset shop". Falkow's family was working-class to poor as he described in his memoir. He was therefore a first-generation Jewish American. Falkow worked at a toy shop in order to collect enough money to buy a model microscope, as well as admitted to stealing textbooks, one a nurse's book on infectious diseases, in order to explore microbiology as a career path despite his family's financial situation.

Falkow attributed his early interest in microbiology to reading Microbe Hunters in 1943, when he was 9 years old, which he found at the public library after the family had moved to Newport, Rhode Island. The book is a dramatization of microbiological research written by American microbiologist Paul de Kruif. Because of poor grades until his senior year of high school, an adviser suggested military rather than college. Falkow described himself as an average student, and below average at mathematics, which he later rectified by working through workbooks of high school and college level mathematics later in his career, after earning his Ph.D., in order to analyze and design experiments. In his memoir, Falkow gives credit to his teachers and acknowledges the role that the systemic oppression of women in America in the 1940s–1950s played in his life, stating "I now understand that I was the beneficiary of the repression of women by our society. The best and brightest women in many communities were relegated to the one intellectual role deemed suitable for them. They became teachers and many poured their love of language, science, music and art into students like me."

== Education and career ==
Falkow enrolled in biology at the University of Maine, because of their microbiology department. During the summers he worked in pathology at the hospital in Newport, staining slides and assisting in autopsies. He graduated in 1955. Before he started graduate school at University of Michigan he developed extreme anxiety. He was later diagnosed with agoraphobia. He avoided movie theaters and crowded places between 1955 and 1983 and dropped out of his first attempt at graduate school because of recurring panic attacks. He returned to Rhode Island to live with his parents and work at the Newport Hospital as a technician, focusing on bacteriology and processing and examining patient samples. He re-enrolled in graduate school at Brown University and graduated with a PhD in 1961.

He finished his work for his Ph.D. thesis at the Walter Reed Army Institute of Research (WRAIR) in the Department of Bacterial Immunology. While at Walter Reed, he worked with African-American microbiologist Othello Washington. Washington was older and more experienced than Falkow, but was assigned to be Stan's technician. Upon meeting, Falkow and Washington decided it would be more appropriate and better for both men to work together as a team. The two men worked together on isolating mobile genetic elements and the transfer of genes between E. coli and Salmonella and published a paper together about Proteus species. Falkow also worked with Shigella species and contracted dysentery, which lead to hospitalization, after being exposed to infected monkey feces flung at his face by an infected monkey. Multiple times through his training and early career more senior scientists, some Nobel prize winners, recommended that Falkow focus more on mechanisms of gene expression and less on pathogens because "nobody cares about typhoid". Falkow remained interested in pathogens despite many warnings from his peers and supervisors that infectious diseases were not interesting and were becoming less frequent in wealthy countries and were therefore a diminishing field of study.

His early work in the 1960s focused on the genetic mechanisms, which enable bacteria to become resistant to antibiotics. He showed that organisms, such as Shigella, can possess DNA fragments called plasmids which exist apart from the bacterial chromosome, and that they carry specialized information for survival. Under selective pressure from antibiotics, one species of bacteria can pass its plasmids to another directly without mating, thereby preserving its own specialized survival genes.

In 1966, he joined Georgetown University School of Medicine as a professor of microbiology. He later moved to Seattle to join the faculty of the Department of Microbiology and Immunology at the University of Washington School of Medicine. Here he described how meningitis and gonorrhea organisms acquire plasmids to become resistant to penicillin and other antibiotics.

In the 1970s, Falkow shifted his focus to the infection process. During this period, he showed that a life-threatening diarrhea prevalent in many developing countries is caused by a sub-type of E. coli. He also co-authored (with Royston C. Clowes, Stanley N. Cohen, Roy Curtiss III, Naomi Datta and Richard Novick) a proposal for uniform nomenclature for bacterial plasmids.

In 1981, he was named chairman of the Department of Medical Microbiology at Stanford University School of Medicine, a position he held until 1985. While at Stanford, Falkow encouraged Esther Lederberg to continue directing the Stanford Plasmid Reference Center, an internationally used registry for plasmids, transposons and insertion sequences.)

== Personal life and death ==
Falkow was married to Rhoda Ostroff in January, 1958 with whom he had two daughters. They divorced in 1983. In December, 1983, he married Lucy S. Tompkins.

Falkow and Tompkins met while he was a professor at Georgetown University, and she was a medical student who sought Falkow out to work in his lab. At first, Falkow denied the opportunity to Tompkins, claiming that he would not take female graduate students because he was not comfortable having a female student, which was common in the scientific field in the 1960s. Tompkins rebutted his misogyny firmly, and explicitly pointed out that he was discriminating against her based on her gender. Her argument forced Stan to reconsider his bias and he then allowed her to enter his laboratory as a trainee. For the remainder of his career Falkow continued to hire women trainees, and by the end of his career most of his trainees were female. Falkow later became an advocate and ally of gender equality in science and helped encourage many women to pursue scientific careers.

Falkow had on-going severe anxiety throughout his career. Due to his anxiety early in his career he avoided conferences, airplanes, and giving presentations in general due to the fact that he would shake and sweat noticeably during them. Falkow described his struggle with his mental health as an "uneasy truce" with his "demons" later on in his career as he learned various coping mechanisms. Because of his anxiety during public speaking, he often employed humor in his teaching and presentations to help cope with the tension of a silent audience, which also lead to most of the audience members finding his talks memorable and enjoyable. Falkow kept his condition a secret from his colleagues during his early career, only privately revealing to Arthur Saz, the chair of microbiology at Georgetown University School of Medicine, that he received and benefited from psychoanalysis treatment. Health insurance for mental health treatment was much better for military employees than academics at the time, and a major reason Falkow continued to work at the Walter Reed Army Institute of Research for as long as he did early in his career, but Falkow agreed to a job at Georgetown University because of this disclosure, upon which the chair privately organized Falkow's healthcare benefits to cover his psychoanalysis treatments.

In 2004 Falkow was diagnosed with myelodysplastic syndrome and given a prognosis of two years. He died on May 5, 2018, at the age of 84 at his home in Portola Valley, California, of myelodysplastic syndrome. His death was announced and lifetime achievements highlighted in obituaries in The New York Times, Washington Post, Nature, Science, in a press release from the Americain Society of Microbiology and in various international news sources.

== Contributions ==
=== Molecular microbiology research ===
Falkow has been referred to as the "father of molecular microbial pathogenesis", the study of how infectious microbes and host cells interact to cause disease at the molecular level. Falkow adopted the perspective of viewing infection as a process that is ultimately dependent on both the infecting agent and the host. He discovered that infectious microbes employ genes that are activated only inside host cells. His work carries clinical applications, such as a new vaccine for whooping cough. From enteric pathogens to sexually transmitted diseases to respiratory infections, his influence has left virtually no field untouched.

Falkow and his first graduate student, Richard P. Silver, discovered that episomes (plasmids) are nicked into linear pieces of DNA and transported as linear DNA between two bacterial cells during conjugation. He then collaborated with Mexican scientists Emma Galindo and Jorge Olarte to investigate new forms of penicillin resistance in Shigella isolates from pediatric patients in Mexico City, which lead to the discovery of new forms of "R factors" - genes responsible for antimicrobial resistance. Falkow and trainee Joan Skerman Knapp identified a virulence factor on plasmids of E. coli found in human feces, demonstrating for the first time that the ability to cause disease may be transferable between bacteria.

Falkow was present at the famous Waikiki beach meeting in 1972 between Herb Boyer (who provided the restriction enzyme EcoRI) and Stanley Cohen (who provided the plasmid) that led to a plan to develop recombinant DNA technology. This led to the first cloning of a bacterial virulence factor, the heat stable toxin of E. coli, in a seminal 1976 paper with Magdalene Yh So, which heralded the application of molecular genetics to understanding gene transfer, and ultimately led to the creation of the field of synthetic biology.

Falkow and his trainees developed many methods that moved biological research forward such as: a method for screening patient samples for enteric pathogens, the identification of Salmonella and Shigella in patient samples based on lysine metabolism, the application of nucleic acid hybridization to distinguish different bacterial species, the application of agarose gels to isolate plasmids of various sizes, isolation and creation of different plasmid backbones now used as cloning vectors, a method for identifying unculturable pathogens based on isolated 16S ribosomal RNA sequence, an optimized version of GFP for flow cytometry applications, and a fluorescence-based method for the detection of genes expressed by pathogens inside of host cells, among many other techniques.

After studying the DNA content of many different pathogenic microbes, Falkow became one of the first scientists to suggest bacterial taxonomy should be based on DNA composition rather than phenotypic observations.

Falkow and others created the universal nomenclature scheme for plasmids still in use today.

Falkow established ‘Molecular Koch’s postulates’ for defining virulence determinants, which continues to influence thinking and experimental design in infectious disease research.

=== Teaching and service ===
Falkow valued and enjoyed teaching as a fundamental part of scientific training and believed that all scientists have a duty to teach and train the next generation. In all of his years of employment at academic institutions, he taught students in some capacity between medical, graduate, undergraduate courses and invited lectures for courses whenever he was able to. In 2010, he recorded lectures on microbial pathogenesis for iBiology, and those videos are still publicly available on the iBiology website and on YouTube. When Falkow became an emeritus Professor at Stanford University, he still taught students. Indeed, he co-taught with Lucy Tompkins a class open to undergraduate and graduate students on the history of Infectious Disease.

Falkow organized the first international symposium of invited speakers on antimicrobial resistance.

Falkow and his student Vickers Herschfield investigated water sources in the D.C. area to find examples of plasmids containing antimicrobial resistance genes. Unexpectedly, they found that the Potomac River and Rock Creek, considered "clean" water sources used for recreation at the time, were full of fecal waste and alerted many government offices about their findings, which were at first largely ignored. In the summer of 1971, Falkow held a press conference warning D.C. citizens not to let their children play in the Potomac River, stating "one cup of Potomac River water is equivalent to a half gram of human feces".

Falkow served on the first NIH Recombinant DNA committee to recommend policy guidelines for the use of recombinant DNA to the United States of America Congress. Many of Falkow's publications are referenced in the Recombinant DNA Regulation Act of 1977.

Falkow worked with the FDA of the United States throughout his career to advocate for the decrease of antimicrobial agents used in livestock feed.

== Awards and honors ==
Falkow was elected President of the American Society for Microbiology from July 1997 through June 1998. He was elected to the Institute of Medicine in 1997 and received the Maxwell Finland Award from the National Foundation of Infectious Diseases in 1999. He also received in 1999 an Honorary Doctor of Science, University of Guelph, Guelph, Ontario, and the University of Maine Alumni Career Award. He has received honorary doctorates in Europe and the US. He received numerous awards for his achievements in science, including the Bristol-Myers Squibb Award for Distinguished Achievement in Infectious Disease Research, the Altemeier Medal from the Surgical Infectious Diseases Society of America, the Howard Taylor Ricketts Award Lecture at the University of Chicago, and the Paul Ehrlich and Ludwig Darmstaedter Prize. In 2003, he received the Abbott Lifetime Achievement Award from the American Society for Microbiology and the Selman A. Waksman Award in Microbiology from the National Academy of Sciences. He received the Robert Koch Award in 2000.

Falkow was an elected member of the Institute of Medicine, the National Academy of Sciences, and the National Academy of Arts and Sciences, an elected Fellow of the American Association for the Advancement of Science. He was also elected into the UK's Royal Society as a Foreign Member.

In September 2008, Falkow was awarded the Lasker Award for medical research.

In May, 2016, Falkow was awarded by Barack Obama the National Medal of Science for his monumental contributions toward understanding how microbes cause disease and resist the effects of antibiotics, and for his inspiring mentorship that created the field of molecular microbial pathogenesis.

== Trainees ==
Stanley Falkow is known for training many experts in the field of molecular microbiology who then became prominent professors and scientists all over the world, including;

- Manuel Amieva - Professor of Pediatrics (Infectious Disease), Stanford University School of Medicine
- Igor Brodsky - Professor of Pathobiology, University of Pennsylvania School of Veterinary Medicine
- Carleen Collins - Professor of Microbiology, University of Washington
- Gordon Dougan - Professor, Department of Medicine, University of Cambridge
- Brett Finlay - Professor of Microbiology and Immunology, University of British Columbia
- Karen Guillemin - Professor of Biology, University of Oregon
- Carlton Gyles (sabbatical) - Professor of Veterinary Pathobiology, University of Guelph
- Fred Heffron - Professor of Molecular Microbiology and Immunology, Oregon Health and Science University
- Joan Skerman Knapp - Scientist, Venereal Disease Control Division, Centers for Disease Control and Prevention
- Michael Koomey - Professor of Genetics and Evolutionary Biology, University of Oslo
- Donald J. LeBlanc - Professor of Microbiology, University of Texas Health Science Center at San Antonio
- Ralph Isberg - Professor of Molecular Biology and Microbiology, Tufts University School of Medicine
- Leonard Mayer - Senior Scientific Advisor, Centers for Disease Control and Prevention
- Denise Monack - Professor of Microbiology and Immunology, Stanford University School of Medicine
- Stephen L. Moseley - Professor of Microbiology, University of Washington at Seattle
- Peter Piot - Professor of Global Health, London School of Hygiene and Tropical Medicine
- Daniel Portnoy - Professor of Molecular and Cell Biology & Plant and Microbial Biology, University of California at Berkeley
- Lalita Ramakrishnan - Professor, Department of Medicine, University of Cambridge
- David Relman - Professor of Microbiology and Immunology, Stanford University School of Medicine
- Richard P. Silver - Professor of Microbiology and Immunology, University of Rochester Medical School
- Magdalene Yh So - Director of the Microbial Pathogenesis Program, University of Arizona College of Medicine
- Lucy S. Tompkins - Professor of Microbiology and Immunology, Stanford University School of Medicine
- Raphael Valdivia - Professor of Integrative Immunobiology, Duke University School of Medicine
- Alison Weiss - Professor of Molecular Genetics, Biochemistry & Microbiology, University of Cincinnati College of Medicine
- Rod Welch - Professor of Medical Microbiology & Immunology, University of Wisconsin at Madison
