= Naomi Datta =

British geneticist

Professor Naomi Datta FRS
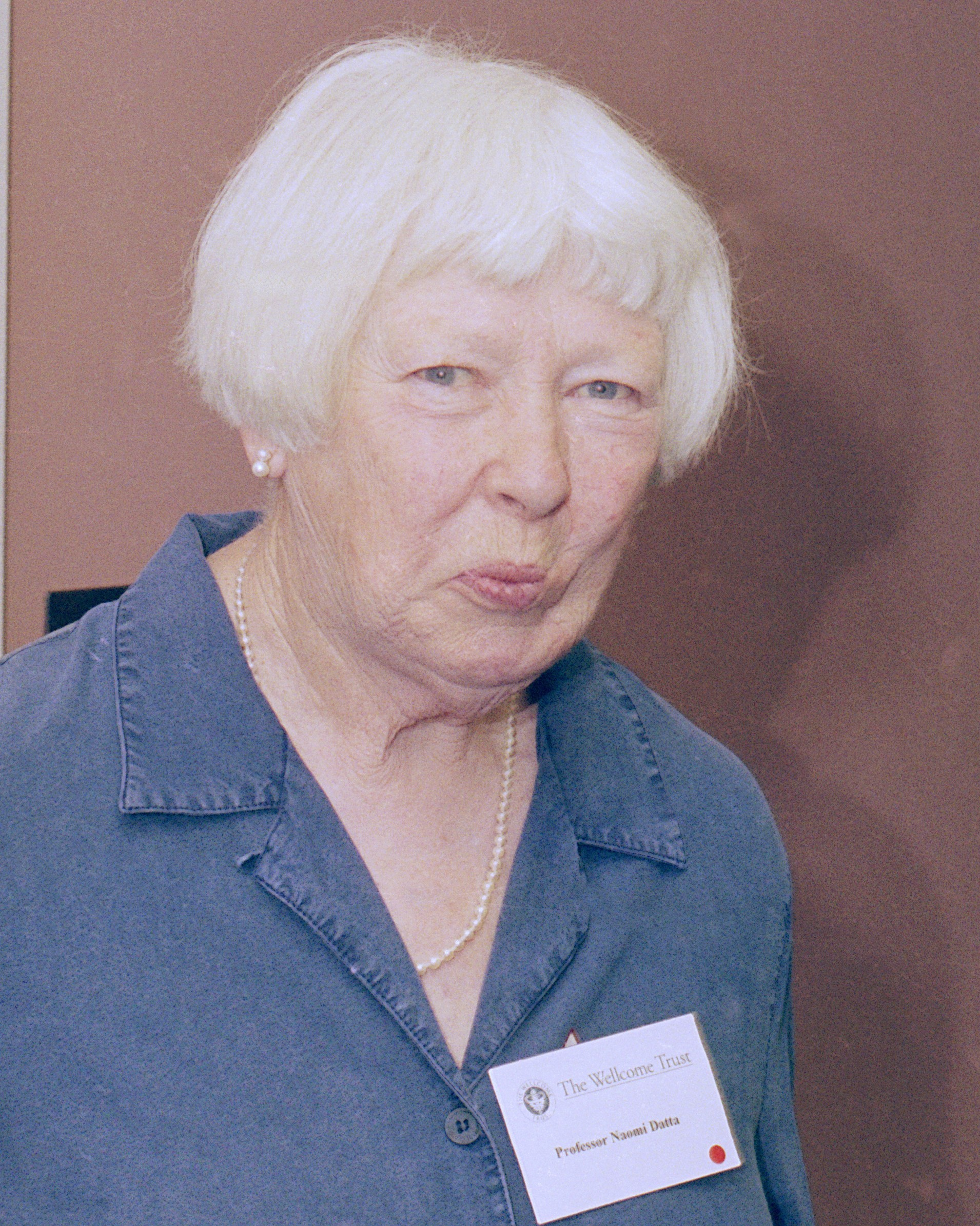
- Datta in May 1998
- Born: 17 September 1922; London, England
- Died: 30 November 2008 (aged 86)
- Medical career
- Research: Bacteriology

Naomi Datta, FRS (née Goddard; 17 September 1922 – 30 November 2008) was a distinguished British geneticist. Working at Hammersmith Hospital in the 1950s and early 1960s, she identified horizontal gene transfer as a source of multi-antibiotic resistance in bacteria.

== Research history ==
After qualifying in medicine in 1946, Datta joined the Public Health Laboratory Service as a bacteriologist and worked here for ten years. She then worked at the Royal Postgraduate Medical School at Hammersmith Hospital for almost three decades, joining as a lecturer in 1957 and later becoming professor of microbial genetics. It was here that she made a significant breakthrough by demonstrating that antibiotic resistance could be transmitted between bacteria, the first time this had been shown outside Japan.

In 1959 there was a severe outbreak of Salmonella typhimurium phage-type 27 and, as part of her research at Hammersmith Hospital, Datta examined 309 cultures to see if the strain was unaltered after moving through hosts. 25 of the 309 were found to be drug-resistant, eight of which were resistant to Streptomycin which had been used to treat the patients. Notably, Datta observed that earlier cultures of the salmonella typhimurium infection (from the start of the outbreak) were not drug-resistant, so it seemed that the antibiotic resistance had developed over time.

Datta published these findings in 1960, in the paper An outbreak of infection with Salmonella typhimurium in a general hospital, and later in 1962 in the paper Transmissible drug resistance in an epidemic strain of Salmonella typhimurium in the Journal of Hygiene.

In later years she published many important studies on the occurrence and significance of drug resistance plasmids in enterobacterial infections. For example, Dr. Datta co-authored (with Royston C. Clowes, Stanley Cohen, Roy Curtiss III, Stanley Falkow and Richard Novick) a proposal for uniform nomenclature for bacterial plasmids.

She also made distinguished contributions to research on the molecular biology of R factors, and she pioneered the classification of R factors and other plasmids by their incompatibilities. She found that some resistance genes, including those for gentamicin resistance, are located on transposons and are readily transferred between replicons.

== Earlier background ==
Born Naomi Goddard in London, she was educated at St Mary's School, Wantage in Oxfordshire and later at the University of Paris. At the outbreak of World War II, she returned to England to study medicine at University College London (UCL).

She married her husband, Prakash Datta, in 1943, having met him in Leatherhead, Surrey, where she was studying having been evacuated from the capital two years earlier. She qualified as a doctor in 1946 and the following year worked as a junior doctor in various hospitals.

Her first cousin was the distinguished soldier and Acting President of Rhodesia Henry Everard; their grandfather's first cousins were architect Henry Goddard and Mormon pioneer George Goddard.

== Later years ==
Datta retired in 1984 and became emeritus professor of microbial genetics at the University of London. The year after her retirement, in 1985, she was elected to fellowship of the Royal Society.

During her retirement, she continued to pursue academia by first studying a postgraduate course in linguistics (although she was not able to obtain a qualification as she did not possess an undergraduate qualification in an arts subject), and then achieving a master's degree in human evolution in the department of anthropology. At 75, she was the oldest in the group.

Known for her cooking and hospitality, Datta contributed to the Royal Society's anthology on food But the crackling is superb.
