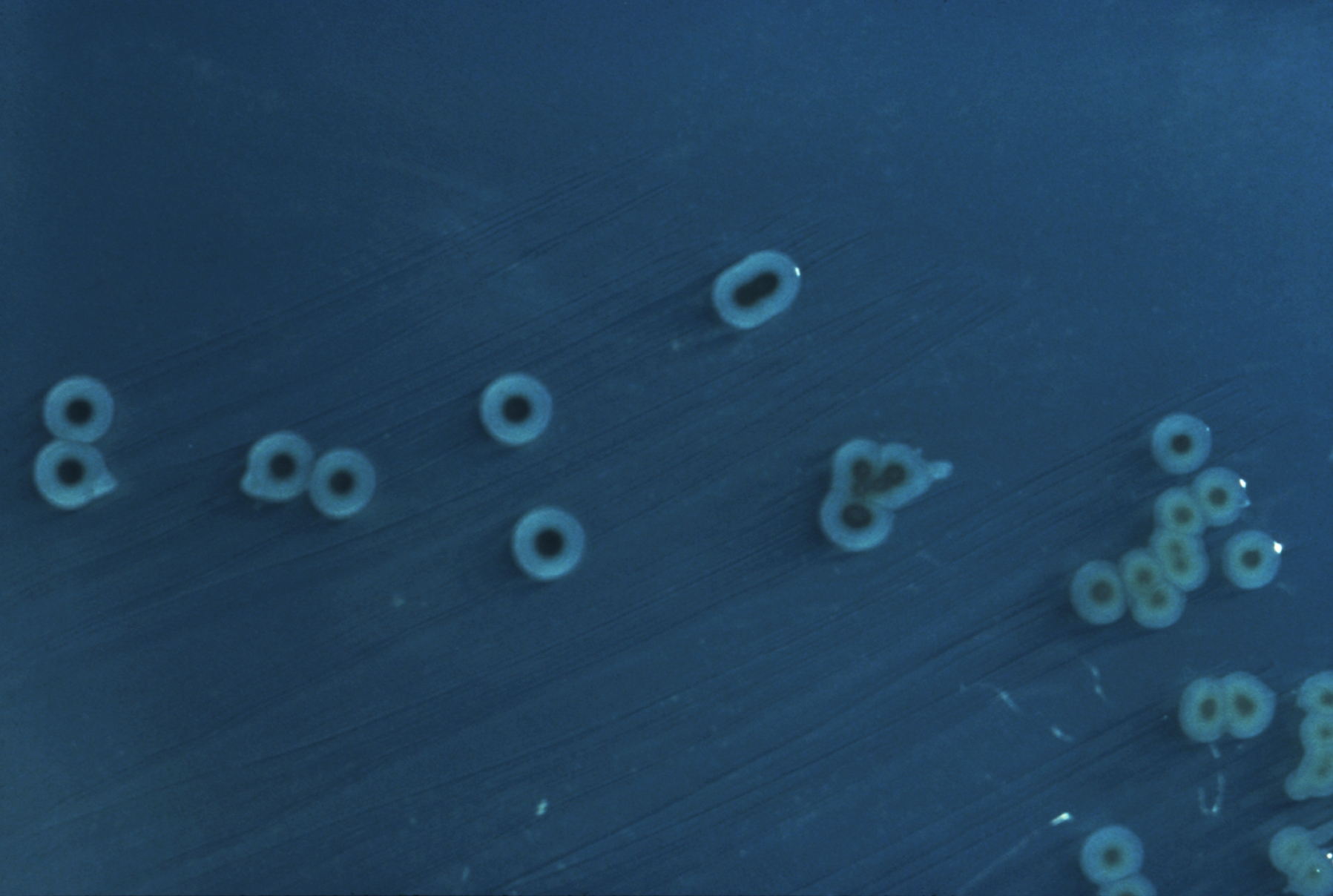
- S. enterica Typhimurium colonies on a Hektoen enteric agar plate

Scientific classification
- Domain: Bacteria
- Kingdom: Pseudomonadati
- Phylum: Pseudomonadota
- Class: Gammaproteobacteria
- Order: Enterobacterales
- Family: Enterobacteriaceae
- Genus: Salmonella
- Species: S. enterica

Binomial name
- Salmonella enterica (ex Kauffmann & Edwards 1952) Le Minor & Popoff 1987

Subspecies
- S. enterica subsp. arizonae; S. enterica subsp. diarizonae; S. enterica subsp. enterica; S. enterica subsp. houtenae; S. enterica subsp. indica; S. enterica subsp. salamae

= Salmonella enterica =

Species of bacterium

Salmonella enterica (formerly Salmonella choleraesuis) is a rod-shaped, flagellate, facultative anaerobic, Gram-negative bacterium and a species of the genus Salmonella. It is divided into six subspecies, arizonae (IIIa), diarizonae (IIIb), houtenae (IV), salamae (II), indica (VI), and enterica (I). A number of its serovars are serious human pathogens; many of them are (more specifically) serovars of Salmonella enterica subsp. enterica.

== Epidemiology ==
Most cases of salmonellosis are caused by food infected with S. enterica, which often infects cattle and poultry, though other animals such as domestic cats and hamsters have also been shown to be sources of infection in humans. It primarily resides in the intestinal tract of animals and humans and can be found in feedstuff, soil, bedding, litter, and fecal matter.

The primary reservoir for the pathogen is poultry and 70% of human cases are attributed to the consumption of contaminated eggs, chicken, or turkey. Raw chicken eggs and goose eggs can harbor S. enterica, initially in the egg whites, although most eggs are not infected. As the egg ages at room temperature, the yolk membrane begins to break down and S. enterica can spread into the yolk. Refrigeration and freezing do not kill all the bacteria, but substantially slow or halt their growth. Pasteurizing and food irradiation are used to kill Salmonella for commercially produced foodstuffs containing raw eggs such as ice cream. Foods prepared in the home from raw eggs, such as mayonnaise, cakes, and cookies, can spread salmonellae if not properly cooked before consumption. Salmonella is the leading foodborne pathogen in the United States, causing the most deaths and having the highest cost burden. It is a resilient microorganism capable of surviving long periods of time in hot and dry environments, increasing its effectiveness as a pathogen and making it able to survive the harsh environments of the gastrointestinal tract and farms.

S. enterica genomes have been reconstructed from up to 6,500 year old human remains across Western Eurasia, which provides evidence for geographic widespread infections with systemic S. enterica during prehistory, and a possible role of the Neolithization process in the evolution of host adaptation. Additional reconstructed genomes from colonial Mexico suggest S. enterica as the cause of cocoliztli, an epidemic in 16th-century New Spain. In 1545, this outbreak of S. enterica spread explosively across what is now Mexico. Over the next century, the disease killed up to 90% of the Indigenous population.

Children under the age of five years, the elderly, and immunosuppressed adults are at an increased risk of systemic dissemination of the disease and need specialized treatment to combat the disease. Drinking extra fluids and antibiotics such as fluoroquinolones are typical treatments. Complications of the disease often appear as anemia or septicaemia, and the mortality rate is 15% once these symptoms arise.

The serogroup S. Typhi is the cause of typhoid fever.

== Nomenclature ==
S. enterica has six subspecies, and each subspecies has associated serovars that differ by antigenic specificity. S. enterica has over 2500 serovars. Salmonella bongori was previously considered a subspecies of S. enterica, but it is now the other species in the genus Salmonella. Most of the human pathogenic Salmonella serovars belong to the enterica subspecies. These serogroups include S. Typhi, S. Enteritidis, S. Paratyphi, S. Typhimurium, and S. Choleraesuis. The serovars can be designated as written in the previous sentence (capitalized and nonitalicized following the genus), or as follows: "S. enterica subsp. enterica, serovar Typhi".

Subspecies S. e. arizonae, named after the state of Arizona, is most commonly found in cold-blooded animals (especially snakes), but can also infect turkey, sheep, and humans. It is endemic in southwestern United States. The similar S. e. subsp. diarizonae also infects snakes and occasionally humans.

== Pathogenesis ==
Secreted proteins are of major importance for the pathogenesis of infectious diseases caused by S. enterica. A remarkably large number of fimbrial and nonfimbrial adhesins are present in Salmonella, and mediate biofilm formation and contact to host cells. Secreted proteins are also involved in host-cell invasion and intracellular proliferation, two hallmarks of Salmonella pathogenesis. Regulatory proteins such as IgaA are also involved in maintaining envelope integrity and modulating stress responses during pathogenesis.

== DNA repair capability ==
Exposure of S. enterica to bile salts, such as sodium deoxycholate, induces the SOS DNA damage response indicating that in this organism bile salts cause DNA damage. Bile salt exposure is found to increase GC to AT transition mutations and also to induce genes of the OxyR and SoxRS regulons suggesting further that bile salts specifically cause oxidative DNA damage. Mutants of S. enterica that are defective in enzymes required for the process of base excision repair are sensitive to bile salts. This indicates that wild-type S. enterica uses base excision repair to remove DNA damages caused by the bile salts. The RecBCD enzyme which functions in recombinational repair of DNA is also required for bile salt resistance.

== Small noncoding RNA ==
Small nonprotein-coding RNAs (sRNA) are able to perform specific functions without being translated into proteins; 97 bacterial sRNAs from Salmonella Typhi were discovered.

AsdA (antisense RNA of dnaA) is a cis-encoded antisense RNA of dnaA described in S. enterica serovar Typhi. It was discovered by deep sequencing and its transcription was confirmed by Northern blot and RACE analysis. AsdA is estimated to be about 540 nucleotides long, and represents the complementary strand to that encoding DnaA, a protein that plays a central role in the initiation of DNA replication and hence cellular division. In rich media, it is highly expressed only after reaching the stationary growth phase, but under limiting iron or osmotic stress, it is already expressed during exponential growth. Overexpression of AsdA stabilizes dnaA mRNA, increasing its levels and thereby enhancing its rate of translation. This suggests that AsdA is a regulator of DNA replication.

== See also ==
- 1984 Rajneeshee bioterror attack
- AsrC small RNA
- Bacterial small RNA
- HilD 3'UTR
- IsrM small RNA
- PinT small RNA
- Typhoid Mary
