= HilD 3'UTR regulatory element =

hilD 3'UTR
- Predicted secondary structure and sequence conservation of hilD 3'UTR

Identifiers
- Rfam: RF02689

Other data
- Domain: Bacteria
- GO: GO:0030371
- SO: SO:0005836,SO:0000205
- PDB structures: PDBe

The 3′ UTR of mRNA hilD, a master regulator of Salmonella pathogenicity island 1 (SPI-1), is a prokaryotic example of functional 3'UTR. The 3'UTR is a target for hilD mRNA degradation by the degradosome and it may play a role in hilD and SPI-1 expression by serving as a target for the Hfq RNA chaperone. Under non-invasive conditions it is necessary to keep low levels of SPI-1 expression. It plays a role in S. Typhimurium virulence as a regulatory motif.
