= Roy Curtiss =

American academic

Roy Curtiss III is a professor of Genomics, Evolution, & Bioinformatics at the University of Florida. He was elected to the United States National Academy of Sciences in 2001.

== Education ==
Curtiss earned his B.S. degree from Cornell University in 1956 and his Ph.D. from the University of Chicago in 1962. At Cornell, he was a member of the Quill and Dagger society.

== Career ==
Curtiss was Charles H. McCauley Professor of Microbiology, University of Alabama at Birmingham (1978–1983), Professor (1983–2005) and Chairman (1983–1993) of Department of Biology, Washington University in St. Louis, and Professor of Genomics, Evolution, & Bioinformatics at Arizona State University (2005–2015). He was the director of the Center for Infectious Diseases and Vaccinology within The Biodesign Institute at Arizona State University. He has published more than 250 articles in scholarly journals (including a proposal for uniform nomenclature for bacterial plasmids, co-authored with Royston C. Clowes, Stanley Cohen, Naomi Datta, Stanley Falkow and Richard P. Novick) and has secured multiple patents.
