= Stanley Norman Cohen =

American geneticist (born 1935)

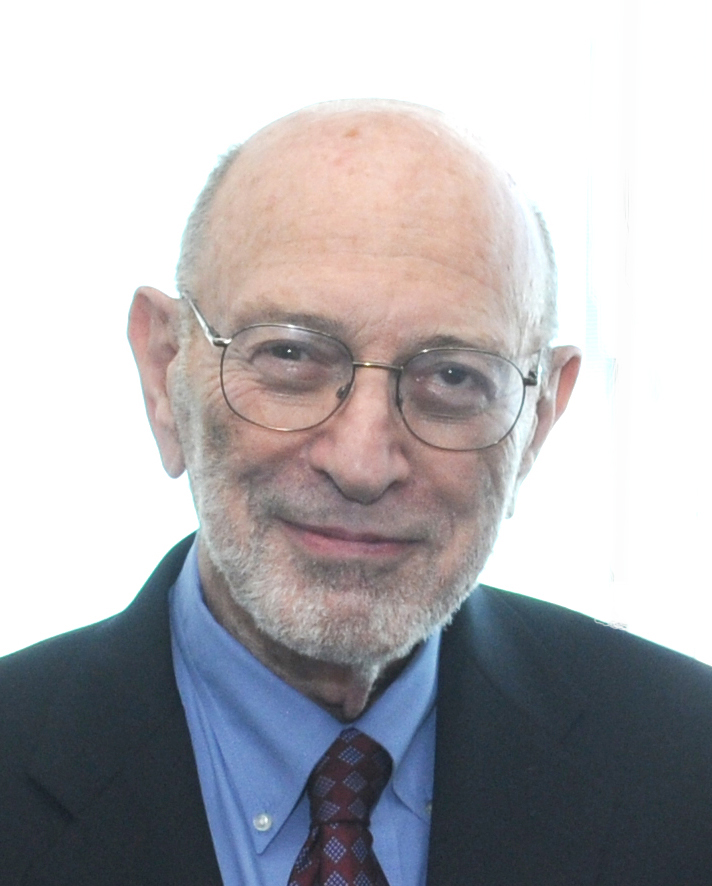
- Stanley Norman Cohen, 2016
- Born: February 17, 1935 (age 91); Perth Amboy, New Jersey
- Education: Rutgers University, University of Pennsylvania
- Spouse: Joanna Lucy Wolter
- Awards: National Medal of Science, Wolf Prize in Medicine
- Scientific career
- Fields: Genetics
- Workplaces: Stanford University
- Doctoral students: Kelly Ten Hagen

Stanley Norman Cohen (born February 17, 1935) is an American geneticist and the Kwoh-Ting Li Professor in the Stanford University School of Medicine. Stanley Cohen and Herbert Boyer were the first scientists to transplant genes from one living organism to another, a fundamental discovery for genetical engineering. Thousands of products have been developed on the basis of their work, including human growth hormone and hepatitis B vaccine. According to immunologist Hugh McDevitt, "Cohen's DNA cloning technology has helped biologists in virtually every field". Without it, "the face of biomedicine and biotechnology would look totally different." Boyer cofounded Genentech in 1976 based on their work together, but Cohen was a consultant for Cetus Corporation and declined to join.

== Early life ==
Cohen was born in Perth Amboy, New Jersey. He graduated from Rutgers University with a B.S. in 1956, and received his M.D. from the University of Pennsylvania School of Medicine in 1960. Cohen then held internships and fellowships at various institutions, including Mount Sinai Hospital in New York City, University Hospital in Ann Arbor, Michigan, and Duke University Hospital in Durham, North Carolina. During a residency at the National Institute for Arthritis and Metabolic Diseases, he decided to combine basic research with a clinical practice. In 1967 he was a postdoctoral researcher at the Albert Einstein College of Medicine.

== Career ==
Cohen discussing his life and career

Cohen joined the faculty of Stanford University in 1968. He was appointed as a Professor of Medicine in 1975, and as a Professor of Genetics in 1977. In 1993, he became the Kwoh-Ting Li Professor in the School of Medicine.

At Stanford he began to explore the field of bacterial plasmids, seeking to understand how the genes of plasmids could make bacteria resistant to antibiotics. At a conference on plasmids in 1972, he met Herbert W. Boyer and discovered that their interests and research were complementary. Plasmids were sent back and forth between Stanley Cohen, Annie C. Y. Chang, and others at Stanford, and Herbert Boyer and Robert B. Helling at the University of California, San Francisco. The Stanford researchers isolated the plasmids, and sent them to the San Francisco team, who cut them using the restriction enzyme EcoRI. The fragments were analyzed and sent back to Stanford, where Cohen's team joined them and introduced them into Escherichia coli. Both laboratories then isolated and analyzed the newly created recombinant plasmids.

This collaboration, in particular the 1973 publication of "Construction of biologically functional bacterial plasmids in vitro" by Cohen, Chang, Boyer and Helling, is considered a landmark in the development of methods to combine and transplant genes. Not only were different plasmids from E. coli successfully joined and inserted back into E. coli cells, but those cells replicated and carried forward the new genetic information. Subsequent experiments that transferred Staphylococcus plasmid genes into E. coli demonstrated that genes could be transplanted between species. These discoveries signaled the birth of genetic engineering, and earned Cohen a number of significant awards, beginning with the Albert Lasker Award for Basic Medical Research in 1980 for "his imaginative and persevering studies of bacterial plasmids, for discovering new opportunities for manipulating and investigating the genetics of cells, and for establishing the biological promise of recombinant DNA methodology."

In 1976, Cohen co-authored a proposal for uniform nomenclature for bacterial plasmids (with Royston C. Clowes, Roy Curtiss III, Naomi Datta, Stanley Falkow and Richard Novick). From 1978 to 1986, Cohen served as chair of the Department of Genetics at Stanford.

During the 1970s and 1980s, Cohen was an active proponent of the potential benefits of DNA technology. He was a signatory of the "Berg letter" in 1974, which called for a voluntary moratorium on some types of research pending an evaluation of risk. He also attended the Asilomar Conference on Recombinant DNA in 1975, and was reportedly uncomfortable with the process and tone of the meeting. He was vocal in the recombinant DNA controversy as the United States government attempted to develop policies for DNA research. Government efforts resulted in the creation of the Recombinant DNA Advisory Committee and the publication of Recombinant DNA research guidelines in 1976, as well as later reports and recommendations. Cohen supported the Baltimore-Campbell proposal, arguing that recommended containment levels for certain types of research should be lowered on the grounds that little risk was involved, and that the proposal should be "a non-regulating code of standard practice."

Today, Cohen is a professor of genetics and medicine at Stanford, where he works on a variety of scientific problems involving cell growth and development, including mechanisms of plasmid inheritance and evolution. He has continued to study plasmid involvement in antibiotic resistance. In particular, he studies mobile genetic elements such as transposons which can "jump" between strains of bacteria. He has developed techniques for studying the behavior of genes in eukaryotic cells using "reporter genes".

=== Plasmid pSC101 ===
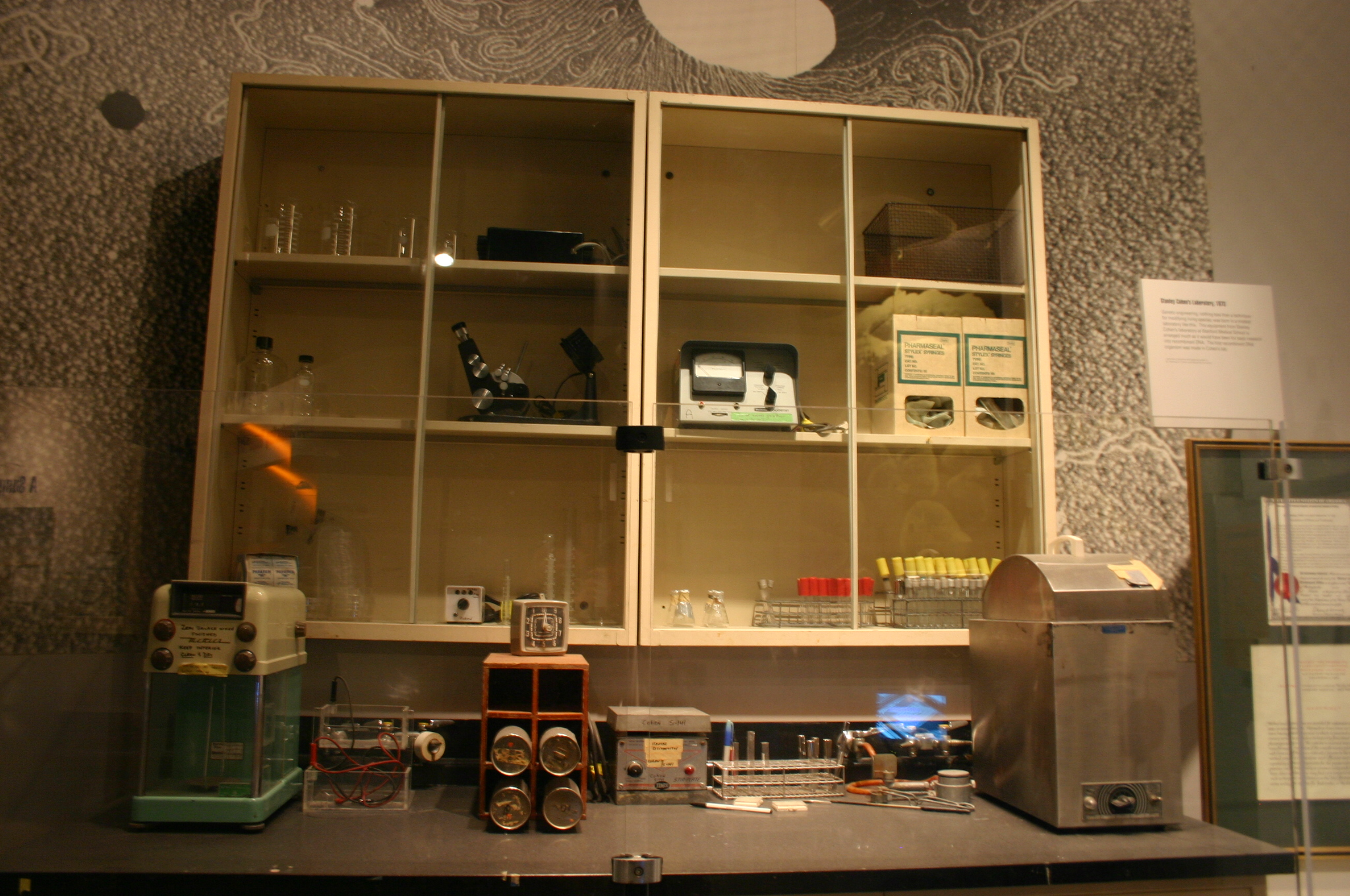
Stanley Norman Cohen's genetic engineering laboratory, 1973 - National Museum of American History

External videos
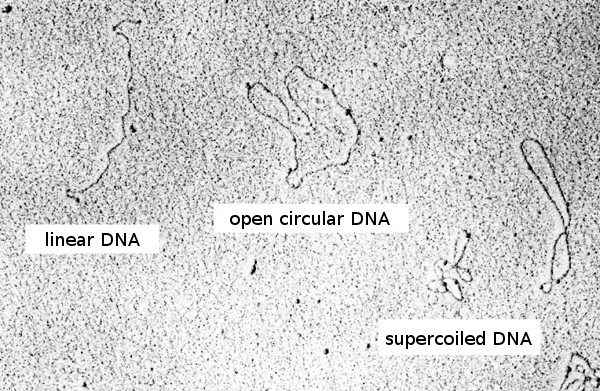
- Electron micrograph of a bacterial DNA plasmid, “Medal of Science 50 Videos -- Stanley Cohen”, National Science Foundation
- “Mechanism of Recombination, 3D animation with basic narration“, DNA Learning Center

Stanley Cohen and Herbert Boyer made what would be one of the first genetic engineering experiments, in 1973. They demonstrated that the gene for frog ribosomal RNA could be transferred into bacterial cells and expressed by them. First they developed a chemical cell transformation method for Escherichia coli, then they constructed a plasmid, which would be the vector, called pSC101. This plasmid contained a single site for the restriction enzyme EcoRI and a gene for tetracycline resistance. The restriction enzyme EcoRI was used to cut the frog DNA into small segments. Next, the frog DNA fragments were combined with the plasmid, which had also been cleaved with EcoRI. The sticky ends of the DNA segments aligned themselves and were afterwards joined using DNA ligase. The plasmids were then transferred into a strain of E. coli and plated onto a growth medium containing tetracycline. The cells that incorporated the plasmid carrying the tetracycline resistance gene grew and formed a colony of bacteria. Some of these colonies consisted of cells that carried the frog ribosomal RNA gene. The scientists then tested the colonies that formed after growth for the presence of frog ribosomal RNA.

=== Patents ===
Cohen and Boyer were not initially interested in filing patents on their work. In 1974 they agreed to file a joint patent application, administered through Stanford, and benefiting both universities. Three patents were eventually granted for the Boyer-Cohen process, one on the actual process (1980), one on prokaryotic hosts (1984) and one on eukaryotic hosts (1988). Licenses were granted non-exclusively for "a moderate fee". Four hundred seventy-eight companies took out licenses, making it one of the university's top five revenue earners. Thousands of products have been developed on the basis of the Boyer-Cohen patents. The Boyer-Cohen patents however were controversial due to its scope as they laid claim to the fundamental technology of gene splicing, and led to many challenges to the validity of the patents in the 1980s. The patents were unusual in that they dominated almost all other patents in the field of molecular biotechnology, and in no other industry have there been patents that had such an all-embracing impact. It also made other universities around the world become aware of the commercial value of the scientific work by their academic staff.

=== Nuredis negligent misrepresentation case ===
In 2018, Cohen was sued by Christopher Alafi for misleading investors in the biotechnology company Nuredis, and hiding details of the FDA disapproval of a drug Cohen had discovered for Huntington's disease. Upon losing a long court battle, Cohen was found liable for negligent misrepresentation, and he admitted to providing wrong testimony in court, although he was not found liable for intentionally misleading investors. The drug had been approved and then withdrawn by the FDA in 1976 for a potentially lethal side effect. As reparations, Cohen paid $29.2 million in damages. In 2024, the appeals court reversed the judgment on procedural grounds and remanded the case back to the trial court for a formal statement of decision.

== Awards ==
- 1979 elected to the National Academy of Sciences
- 1980 Albert Lasker Award for Basic Medical Research
- 1981 Wolf Prize in Medicine
- 1988 National Medal of Science from President Reagan
- 1989 National Medal of Technology (shared with Herbert Boyer) from President Bush
- 1996 Lemelson–MIT Prize
- 2001 National Inventors Hall of Fame
- 2004 Albany Medical Center Prize (shared with Herbert Boyer)
- 2004 Shaw Prize in Life Science and Medicine (shared with Herbert Boyer)
- 2006 elected to the American Philosophical Society
- 2009 Double Helix Medal
- 2016 Biotechnology Heritage Award, from the Biotechnology Industry Organization (BIO) and the Chemical Heritage Foundation
