= SAPI-1 =

Computer released in Czechoslovakia in 1980

The SAPI-1 was a computer produced in the former Czechoslovakia by Tesla since 1980. It was designed by Eduard Smutný (hardware) and his brother Tomáš Smutný (software), and based on the Intel 8080/2 MHz clone (and later Z80). The SAPI-86 was also developed as an 8086 clone of the PC. The SAPI-1 had a modular construction. Three versions of SAPI-1 were produced: SAPI-1 ZPS 1 (základní průmyslová sestava; basic industrial set), SAPI-1 ZPS 2, and SAPI-1 ZPS 3.
