= Daniel A. Portnoy =

American microbiologist (born 1956)

- Born: 1956 (age 69–70); Syracuse, New York
- Education: University of California, Los Angeles; Stanford University
- Occupations: academic, microbiologist
- Employer(s): Washington University in St. Louis; University of Pennsylvania; University of California, Berkeley

Daniel A. Portnoy (born 1956 in Syracuse, New York) is a microbiologist, the Edward E. Penhoet Distinguished Chair in Global Public Health and Infectious Diseases, and a professor of biochemistry, Biophysics and Structural Biology in the Department of Molecular and Cell Biology and in the Division of Microbiology in the Department of Plant and Microbial Biology at the University of California, Berkeley. He is one of the world's foremost experts on Listeria monocytogenes, the bacterium that causes the severe foodborne illness Listeriosis. He has made seminal contributions to multiple aspects of bacterial pathogenesis, cell biology, innate immunity, and cell mediated immunity using L. monocytogenes as a model system and has helped to push forward the use of attenuated L. monocytogenes as an immunotherapeutic tool in the treatment of cancer.

== Education and early career ==
Portnoy got his start in microbiology in the lab of Dr. Sydney Rittenberg working on Bdellovibrio as an undergraduate at University of California, Los Angeles where he earned a B.A. in Bacteriology in 1978. He next earned his Ph.D. in 1983 under the tutelage of Stanley Falkow first at the University of Washington finishing at Stanford University. In the Falkow Lab, he worked on the conserved virulence plasmids in Yersinia enterocolitica, Yersinia pseudotuberculosis, and Yersinia pestis, and discovered what turned out to be the first effectors of type III secretion. To further his appreciation of host cells, he did his postdoctoral fellowship in the Zanvil Cohn Laboratory of Cellular Physiology and Immunology at the Rockefeller University in New York, working with Jay Unkeless and Jeff Ravetch. At Rockefeller University he worked on macrophage Fc receptors and lysosomal proteases.

== Contributions to Listeria monocytogenes biology ==
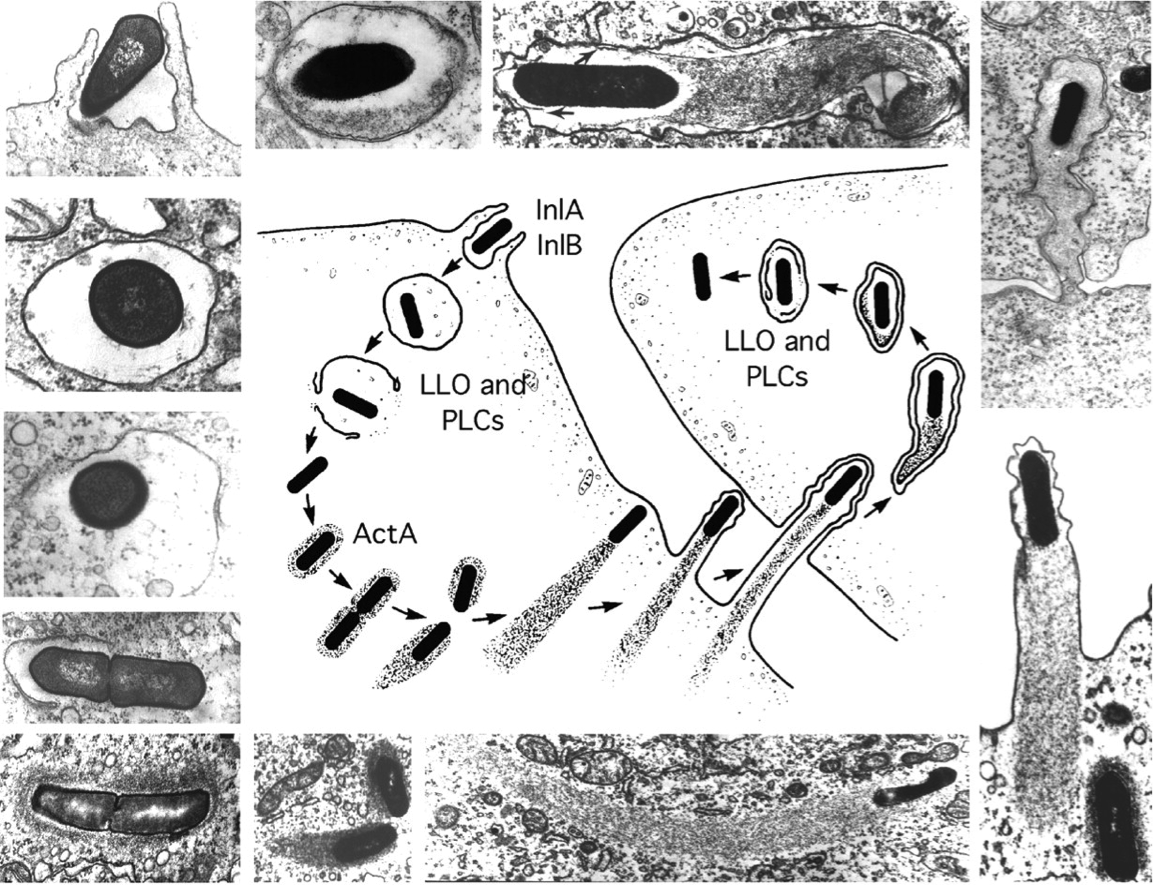
Cartoon and electron micrographs from Dr. Portnoy's seminal observation that L. monocytogenes utilizes host actin to spread cell-to-cell. J Cell Biol 2002 Aug 158(3) 409–14, Figure 1.

In 1986 Portnoy started his independent lab at Washington University in St. Louis where he began his studies on Listeria monocytogenes. In 1988, he joined the Department of Microbiology at the University of Pennsylvania, where he collaborated with Lewis Tilney in the Biology Department and made the observation that L. monocytogenes spreads from one cell to another by exploiting a host cell system of actin polymerization. His lab also defined the role of the listerial hemolysin in mediating dissolution of phagosomes. In collaboration with Philip Youngman, he showed that expression of the L. monocytogenes hemolysin by Bacillus subtilis led to its growth inside of host cells. Portnoy collaborated with Dr. Yvonne Paterson, who also arrived at Penn in 1988, on the use of L. monocytogenes as a recombinant vector-based vaccine for the induction of cell-mediated immunity. Both Paterson and Portnoy went on to work with biotech companies to develop vaccines for both cancer and infectious disease applications. Numerous clinical trials based on their discoveries have shown promising results as immunotherapeutic treatments for cancer.

In 1997, Portnoy moved to UC Berkeley where his lab continues to examine fundamental aspects of L. monocytogenes biology, and has expanded to focus on both innate and acquired immunity in the context of Listeria infection. Portnoy and collaborators have shown that immune cells recognize cyclic di-AMP, a novel and essential bacterial signaling molecule, secreted by L. monocytogenes through multidrug resistance efflux transporters. Portnoy and Russell Vance identified that STING was the host receptor of cyclic-di-nucleotides (CDNs) that leads to the production of type I interferon and other co-regulated genes. Modified CDNs are now being evaluated for clinical application as adjuvants and for cancer immunotherapy.

== Honors and awards ==
Portnoy has been awarded a number of honors over the course of his career including the Eli Lilly and Company Research Award in Microbiology & Immunology, NIH Merit Award, Fellow of the American Academy of Microbiology, Senior Scholar Award in Global Infectious Diseases from the Ellison Foundation, and numerous honorary keynote lectures. In 2013, Portnoy's contributions were recognized by his election to the National Academy of Sciences. In 2017, Portnoy became an Elected Fellow in the National Academy of Inventors.

== Personal life ==
Portnoy has three children. His wife, Anna, is a conservation biologist. His father, Bernard Portnoy, M.D. (1929–2015) was a professor of pediatrics and infectious diseases at USC; his mother, Roslyn Portnoy (1931–2021) lived in Dana Point, CA and his sister, Deborah Brown (born 1953) lives in Sherman Oaks, CA.
