= Rod Welch =

American microbiologist

Rodney A. Welch is professor of medical microbiology and immunology at the University of Wisconsin-Madison. He is a specialist in bacterial pathogenesis and toxins produced by the bacterium Escherichia coli.

Welch earned a BS from Cornell University in 1974 and his PhD from the Medical College of Virginia in 1979. He is a fellow of the American Academy of Microbiology and since 2004 has held the chair of Robert Turell Infections Diseases. In 2014 he was named as part of a team at Wisconsin-Madison that was awarded a grant of up to $16 million from the National Institutes of Health to search for new antibiotics.
