= Lucy S. Tompkins =

American academic

- Education: Georgetown University School of Medicine; Dartmouth School of Medicine
- Known for: Epidemiology; Internal Medicine; Hospital-acquired infections
- Scientific career
- Fields: Medicine Epidemiology Microbiology Immunology
- Workplaces: Stanford University Stanford Hospital

Lucy S. Tompkins is a practicing internist, the Lucy Becker Professor of Medicine for infectious diseases at Stanford University, and a professor of microbiology and immunology. Since 1989, she has been the Epidemiologist and medical director of the Infection Control and Epidemiology Department for Stanford Hospital. She also has been the Associate Dean for Academic Affairs at the Stanford School of Medicine since 2001. She has been the recipient of multiple fellowships throughout her career, including the American Association for the Advancement of Science. Her current research centers around healthcare-related infections and bacterial pathogenesis.

== Education ==
Tompkins earned her PhD in microbiology at Georgetown University School of Medicine in 1971. She attended medical school at Dartmouth School of Medicine in 1973. Upon receiving her M.D., she stayed at Dartmouth for the following two years to complete an internship and then a residency. She completed her second residency in 1976 at the University of Washington School of Medicine, after which she was certified in Internal Medicine by the American Board of Internal Medicine. She finished her professional education with a fellowship at the University of Washington School of Medicine in 1979.

== Career ==
Tompkins is currently a professor of medicine specializing in infectious diseases, a professor of microbiology and immunology at Stanford University, and a practicing internist at Stanford Hospital. From 1983 to 1998 she was the medical director at the Clinical Microbiology Laboratory at Stanford Hospital and Clinics. She was the Chief of the Division of Infectious Diseases and Geographic Medicine at the Department of Medicine from 2001 to 2008. She has been the Hospital Epidemiologist and medical director for the Infection Control and Epidemiology Department for Stanford Hospital and Clinics since 1989. She is also the Associate Dean for Academic Affairs of the School of Medicine, a position she has held since 2001.

=== Honors ===
She was awarded a fellowship by the Infectious Disease Society of America, "an advocacy group of infectious disease specialists based in Arlington, Virginia". She became a member of the Western Association of Physicians in 1990, and in 1995 she became a member of the Association of American Physicians. She was named a fellow of the American Academy of Microbiology in 1997, "the world's oldest and largest group devoted to a single life science". In 1998 she was named a fellow of the Society for Healthcare Epidemiology in America (SHEA), whose "mission is to prevent and control infections in healthcare settings". In 2001, she was chosen to be a fellow of the American Association for the Advancement of Science (AAAS). The fellowship is "an honor bestowed upon members of the association by their peers" and only select persons are chosen each year.

== Research ==
One of her current research interests is in the field of healthcare-related infections, including Clostridioides difficile infections. One Bloomberg News report states that Clostridioides difficile is currently one of three threats considered needing urgent attention due to bacterial resistance to antibiotics. The focus of her lab at Stanford University is in bacterial pathogenesis.

== Publications ==
Tompkins has 58 publications, has collaborated with 134 co-authors between 1971 and 2009, and has been cited by 5,854 authors. She has authored or co-authored several publications on the bacterium helicobacter pylori, including one paper titled "Helicobacter pylori CagA induces a transition from polarized to invasive phenotypes in MDCK cell". Many other publications study healthcare-related illness, including one publication co-authored by Tompkins titled "Investigation of Mediastinitis Due to Coagulase-Negative Staphylococci After Cardiothoracic Surgery". She also edited one book in 1992 titled Campylobacter Jejuni: Current Status and Future Trends. The genus Campylobacter is a topic about which Tompkins has written for multiple publications.
