= Othello Washington =

African American microbiologist

Othello Washington was an African-American microbiologist who worked at the Walter Reed Army Institute of Research from as early as the late 1950s (probably earlier) until at least the late 1980s. Othello went by "Wash" and was a lab technician, although he was known for being very experienced and skilled.

== Career ==
He worked along with Angel Santillion during Stan's PhD thesis work and assisted him in isolating and discovering plasmids. Washington published a paper on the GC content of Proteus species with Stan Falkow, contributing the earliest knowledge of this genus of organisms as distinct species. After working with Falkow, Washington continued to work under Samuel B. Formal, and contributed to multiple fundamental studies of bacterial pathogenesis.

Washington is an author on a study titled "Invasion of HeLa Cells by Salmonella typhimurium: A Model for Study of Invasiveness of Salmonella". This paper helped establish HeLa cells as an appropriate cell line to model Salmonella infection of intestinal epithelium. Washington also was a contributing author on a 1986 study of Shigella pathogenesis.
