= SaPI =

Mobile genetic element in the genome of S. aureus

SaPIs (Staphylococcus aureus pathogenicity islands) are a family of ~15 kb mobile genetic elements resident in the genomes of the vast majority of S. aureus strains. Much like bacteriophages, SaPIs can be transferred to uninfected cells and integrate into the host chromosome. Unlike the bacterial viruses, however, integrated SaPIs are mobilized by host infection with "helper" bacteriophages (specific SaPIs may require specific helper bacteriophages for mobilization, though Staphylococcus phage 80alpha appears to mobilize all known SaPIs). SaPIs are used by the host bacteria to co-opt the phage reproduction cycle for their own genetic transduction and also inhibit phage reproduction in the process.

SaPIs can infect many strains that are resistant to phages and can readily be transferred to Listeria monocytogenes even though staphylococcal phages cannot grow in Listeria cells. SaPIs occur infrequently in other staphylococcal species, but SaPI-like elements are common and widespread in other Gram-positive cocci.

== Mechanism ==
SaPI DNA is maintained in a prophage-like state under the control of a master repressor and is induced to excise and replicate by helper phages encoding proteins that counter the SaPI repressor. One set of SaPIs is induced by other co-resident SaPIs which must first be induced by helper phages, setting up a 3-way cascade For most SaPIs, following replication, concatemeric SaPI DNA is packaged by the headful mechanism, utilizing a small terminase subunit (TerS) encoded by the SaPI in phage-like particles that are released in numbers approaching 10^{9}/ml by phage-induced lysis. A subset of SaPIs have acquired a cos site and use the phage’s TerS for packaging by the cos mechanism.' The released SaPI particles infect other staphylococcal cells, injecting their DNA which integrates into a specific chromosomal attachment site of which there are 5 in S. aureus. SaPIs are ancestrally related to Siphoviridae and possess phage-related genes enabling their integration/excision, replication, and packaging. They lack structural phage proteins and lysis proteins and utilize those of the helper phage, which they modify to form small capsids commensurate with their genomes.

== Function ==
Their evolutionary divergence from an ancestral prophage has involved not only the loss of structural and lytic proteins, but also the development (or acquisition) of several different means of partially blocking reproduction of their helper phages. These phage interference functions are advantageous both to the host cell, as they (partially) block predation by exogenous phages, and to the SaPI, as they enable it to keep pace with helper phage reproduction. Unlike the CRISPRs, which simply destroy infecting phages and thus totally block phage-mediated horizontal gene transfer (HGT), the SaPIs are major agents of phage–dependent HGT, as they only partially block phage reproduction and also package chromosomal fragments as well as their own genomes.

== Role in pathogenicity ==
SaPIs were discovered on the basis of their carriage of the gene for toxic shock syndrome toxin-1 and they are uniquely responsible for staphylococcal toxic shock. They also carry other superantigen toxins as well as other virulence factors among which is a set of genes enabling their host strains to coagulate farm animal blood plasma. These genes encode different alleles of a coagulase, the von Willebrand factor-binding protein, which has a role in determining the animal host specificity of S. aureus. The toxin and other accessory genes are expressed by the integrated and repressed SaPI genomes, as are the toxin genes of converting prophages.

== Conversion to antibacterial agents ==
One of the original SaPIs, SaPI2, has been converted to a non-antibiotic therapeutic agent for the treatment of staphylococcal and listerial infections. This conversion involved the removal of all toxin and other virulence genes, and of the capsid morphogenesis genes, and the addition, by cloning, of antibacterial genes including those encoding CRISPR/cas9 with spacers targeting conserved chromosomal genes. These cause a lethal double-stranded DNA cleavage in the target protospacer. Alternative cargos include CRISPR/dcas9 with spacers targeting and inhibiting genes that regulate bacterial virulence, or the gene for lysostaphin, a powerful staphylolytic enzyme. The production of these transformed SaPI2s, known as antibacterial drones (ABDs), is greatly enhanced by deleting the helper prophage’s terS gene so that only ABD DNA is packaged. The ABDs cure experimental staph infections in mice and are being further developed for clinical use. To preclude the development of resistance, ABDs for potential clinical use will always contain at least two different antibacterial modules that act by different mechanisms.
