= Network Service Access Point Identifier =

Identifier used in GPRS (cellular data) networks

A Network (Layer) Service Access Point Identifier (NSAPI) is an identifier used in GPRS (cellular data) networks.

It is used to identify a Packet Data Protocol (PDP) context (a unique data session) in the Mobile Station (MS) and in the Serving GPRS Support Node (SGSN). It is dynamically selected by the MS (however, the MS should ensure that the selected NSAPI is not currently being used by another session management entity in the MS). When the MS requests a PDP context, it selects an NSAPI that it sends to the SGSN with the request.

NSAPI is also used as part of the Tunnel Identifier between GPRS Support Nodes (GSNs). The user identity (International Mobile Subscriber Identity (IMSI)) and the application identifier (NSAPI) are integrated into the Tunnel Identifier (GTPv0) (TID) or Tunnel Endpoint Identifier (GTPv1) (TEID) that uniquely identifies the subscriber's sublink between the GSNs (SGSN and GGSN). The SGSN inserts the NSAPI along with the SGSN address in the “Create PDP Context Request.” One PDP context may have several (secondary) PDP contexts and NSAPI. The NSAPI is an integer value within the PDP context header.

In the UMTS system the data connection between a GPRS Core Network and a mobile station is identified using an NSAPI, that identifies as well a radio access bearer. In the previous releases of GPRS (pre-Release’00), a connection is identified by NSAPI and a Logical Link Control (LLC) protocol SAPI. However, in UMTS, and thus in GPRS Release’00, the LLC protocol is no longer used.
