= Pathogenicity island =

Class of genomic islands

Pathogenicity islands (PAIs), as termed in 1990, are a distinct class of genomic islands acquired by microorganisms through horizontal gene transfer. Pathogenicity islands are found in both animal and plant pathogens. Additionally, PAIs are found in both gram-positive and gram-negative bacteria. They are transferred through horizontal gene transfer events such as transfer by a plasmid, phage, or conjugative transposon. Although the general makeup of pathogenicity islands (PAIs) might vary throughout bacterial pathogen strains, all PAIs are known to have characteristics with all genomic islands, which includes virulence genes, functional mobility elements, and areas of homology to tRNA genes and direct repeats. Therefore, PAIs enables microorganisms to induce disease and also contribute to microorganisms' ability to evolve. The spread of antibiotic resistance and, more generally, the conversion of non-pathogenic strains in natural environments to strains that infect animal and plant hosts with disease are two examples of the evolutionary and ecological changes brought about by the transmission and acquisition of PAIs among bacterial species. However, It is impossible to overlook their impact on bacterial evolution, though, since if a PAI is acquired and is stably absorbed, it can irreversibly change the bacterial genome.

One species of bacteria may have more than one PAI. For example, Salmonella has at least five. An analogous genomic structure in rhizobia is termed a symbiosis island.

== Properties ==
Pathogenicity islands (PAIs) are gene clusters incorporated in the genome, chromosomally or extrachromosomally, of pathogenic organisms, but are usually absent from those nonpathogenic organisms of the same or closely related species. They may be located on a bacterial chromosome or may be transferred within a plasmid or can be found in bacteriophage genomes. Every genomic island has the following characteristics; a GC- content that differs from the surrounding DNA sequence, a connection with tRNA genes, the presence of repeats on both ends (flanking), and the capacity to recombine, which is usually shown by the presence of an integrase. The GC-content and codon usage of pathogenicity islands often differs from that of the rest of the genome, potentially aiding in their detection within a given DNA sequence, unless the donor and recipient of the PAI have similar GC-content.

The most basic kind of mobile genetic element is an insertion sequence (IS), which usually just has one or two open reading frames that encode genes to make transposition easier. Sections inside the PAI may be rearranged or deleted with the use of IS components. These changes encourages adaption and aid in the generation of alternative strains. PAIs also contain transposons, which are more sophisticated forms of IS elements. The majority are surrounded by brief terminal inverted repeats that serve as homologous recombination sites, enhancing a PAI's stability. Bacteriophage integrases also found on pathogenicity islands (PAIs) are enzymes produced by bacteriophages to enable site-specific recombination between two recognition sequences, serving as another form of mobility element to enable PAIs insertion into host DNA. PAIs are often associated with tRNA genes, which target sites for this integration event. Given that integration may result in tRNA truncation, it is probable that only non-essential tRNA loci found in multiple locations, or those possessing wobble capacity (the ability of a 5' base of a tRNA anticodon to mispair with the third base of an mRNA codon) can become common integration sites. They can be transferred as a single unit to new bacterial cells, thus conferring virulence to formerly benign strains.

Pathogenicity islands carry genes encoding one or more virulence factors, including, but not limited to, adhesins, secretion systems (type III and IV secretion system), toxins, invasins, modulins, effectors, superantigens, iron uptake systems, o-antigen synthesis, serum resistance, immunoglobulin A proteases, apoptosis, capsule synthesis, and plant tumorigenesis via Agrobacterium tumefaciens. Type III and type IV secretion systems, which are both expressed in Gram-negative bacteria, are the secretion systems most frequently linked to PAIs. The bacterial membranes contain the type III secretion system (T3SS), which functions essentially as a molecular syringe. The needle-like apparatus secretes effectors, which go from the bacterial cell to the host cell via the tip of the apparatus, creating a hole in the membrane of the host cell.

There are various combinations of regulation involving pathogenicity islands. The first combination is that the pathogenicity island contains the genes to regulate the virulence genes encoded on the PAI. The second combination is that the pathogenicity island contains the genes to regulate genes located outside of the pathogenicity island. Additionally, regulatory genes outside of the PAI may regulate virulence genes in the pathogenicity island. Regulation genes typically encoded on PAIs include AraC-like proteins and two-component response regulators.

PAIs can be considered unstable DNA regions as they are susceptible to deletions or mobilization. This may be due to the structure of PAIs, with direct repeats, insertion sequences and association with tRNA that enables deletion and mobilization at higher frequencies. Additionally, deletions of pathogenicity islands inserted in the genome can result in disrupting tRNA and subsequently affect the metabolism of the cell.

== Examples ==
- The P fimbriae island contains virulence factors such as haemolysin, pili, cytotoxic necrosing factor, and uropathogenic specific protein (USP).
- Yersinia pestis high pathogenicity island I has genes regulating iron uptake and storage.
- Salmonella SP-1 and SP-2 sites regulates bacterium's invasion and survival within host cells.
- Rhodococcus equi virulence plasmid pathogenicity island encodes virulence factors for proliferation in macrophages.
- The SaPI family of Staphylococcus aureus pathogenicity islands, mobile genetic elements, encode superantigens, including the gene for toxic shock syndrome toxin, and are mobilized at high frequencies by specific bacteriophages.
- Phage encoded cholera toxin of Vibrio cholerae, diphtheria toxin of Corynebacterium diphtheriae, neurotoxins of Clostridium botulinum and cytotoxin of Pseudomonas aeruginosa.
- Helicobacter pylori has two strains, one being more virulent than the other due to the presence of the Cag pathogenicity island.
- Escherichia coli pathogenicity island carries genes of toxins (e.g., Shiga toxin) in enterohemorrhagic E. coli (EHEC) strains.
