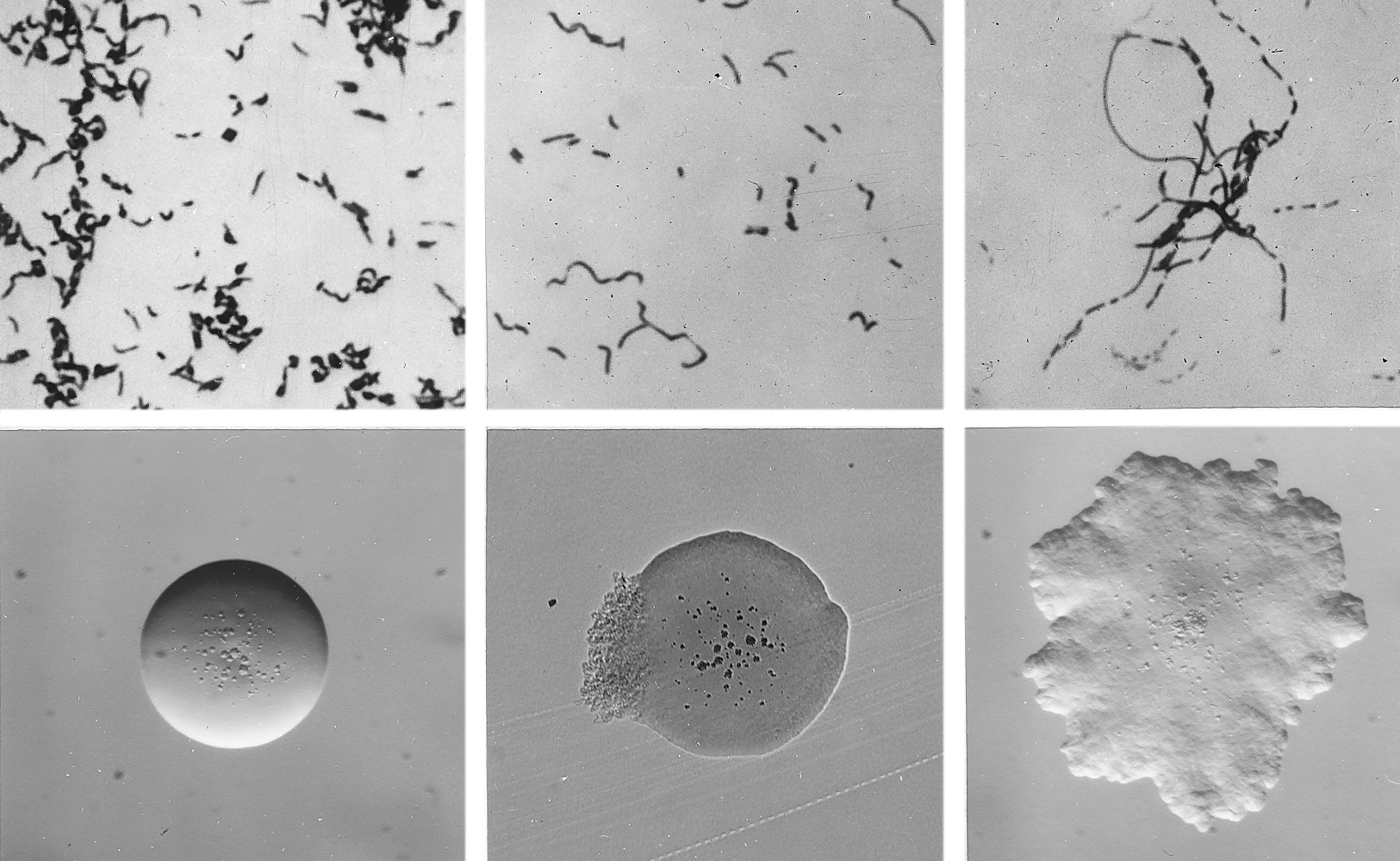
- Cellular and colonial morphology of Erysipelothrix rhusiopathiae

Scientific classification
- Domain: Bacteria
- Kingdom: Bacillati
- Phylum: Bacillota
- Class: Erysipelotrichia
- Order: Erysipelotrichales
- Family: Erysipelotrichaceae
- Genus: Erysipelothrix; Rosenbach 1909

Type species
- Erysipelothrix erysipeloides (Trevisan 1889) Rosenbach 1909

Species
- See text

= Erysipelothrix =

Genus of bacteria

Erysipelothrix is a genus of bacteria containing four described species: Erysipelothrix rhusiopathiae, Erysipelothrix tonsillarum, Erysipelothrix inopinata and Erysipelothrix larvae. Additional species have been proposed based on DNA-DNA hybridization studies. "The hallmark of Erysipelothrix is the presence of a type B cell wall, in which the peptide bridge is formed between amino acids at positions 2 and 4 of adjacent peptide side-chains and not, as in the vast majority of bacteria, between amino acids at positions 3 and 4."

The best-known species within the genus is Erysipelothrix rhusiopathiae, which is the cause of erysipelas of domestic pigs, poultry and other animal species. In humans, E. rhusiopathiae infections are termed erysipeloid. Erysipelothrix tonsillarum has been described as a pathogen for dogs and has been isolated from the tonsils of healthy pigs and cattle. Disease caused by E. inopinata or E. larvae has not been described.

Bacteria of genus Erysipelothrix are straight or slightly curved, slender, nonmotile rods that may exist singly, in V-shaped pairs, or in short chains. Some strains have a tendency to form long filaments. The bacteria are Gram-positive but can be mistaken for Gram-negative bacteria during analysis because they lose their staining easily. They are aerobic to facultatively anaerobic but not acid-fast.

== Phylogeny ==
The currently accepted taxonomy is based on the List of Prokaryotic names with Standing in Nomenclature (LPSN) and National Center for Biotechnology Information (NCBI).

16S rRNA based LTP_10_2024

- Erysipelothrix
  - E. larvae Bang et al. 2016
  - - - E. inopinata Verbarg et al. 2004
      - - E. anatis Eisenberg et al. 2022
        - E. aquatica Eisenberg et al. 2022
    - - E. urinaevulpis Eisenberg et al. 2022
      - - E. rhusiopathiae (Migula 1900) Buchanan 1918
        - - E. piscisicarius Pomaranski et al. 2020
          - E. tonsillarum Takahashi et al. 1987

120 marker proteins based GTDB 09-RS220

- Erysipelothrix
  - E. larvae
  - - E. urinaevulpis
    - - - E. inopinata
        - - E. anatis
          - E. aquatica
      - - E. tonsillarum
        - - E. piscisicarius
          - E. rhusiopathiae

Unassigned species:

- E. amsterdamensis Zhong et al. 2024
- "E. enhydrae" Chang et al. 2024
- "E. muris" Chen et al. 2006
