= Eubacterium eligens =

Scientific classification
- Domain: Bacteria
- Kingdom: Bacillati
- Phylum: Bacillota
- Class: Clostridia
- Order: Eubacteriales
- Family: Eubacteriaceae
- Genus: Eubacterium
- Species: E. eligens

Binomial name
- Eubacterium eligens Holdeman and Moore, 1974

Type strain
- ATCC 27750, DSM 3376, VPI C15-48, C15-B4

Synonyms
- Eubacterium eligens or Lachnospira eligens

Gram-positive anaerobic bacteria

Eubacterium eligens is a motile, obligate anaerobic, Gram-positive, rod-shaped mesophilic bacteria that lives in the human gut microbiome. In 1974, W.E.C Moore and Lillian V. Holdeman isolated and identified over 100 bacterial species from human feces, including E. eligens. The genus Eubacterium inhabits normal gut microbiota and contributes to anti-inflammatory secretions. E. eligens is unlike most Firmicutes species in that it can degrade pectin, which is usually more common among Bacteroidetes.

== Characteristics ==
=== Taxonomy & phylogeny ===
Eubacterium eligens is a member of the Bacillota (previously Firmicutes) phylum, which is one of two phyla which constitute more than 90% of microflora in the human gut. Characteristics of this phylum include low GC content in the DNA and Gram-positivity. Within the class Clostridia, E. eligens is placed in the order Clostridiales, which includes a large variety of anaerobic bacteria with varying metabolic capabilities. E. eligens is a member of the Eubacterium genus, a phylogenetically and phenotypically diverse genus. The genus was first proposed in 1938 by French bacteriologist Prévot, grouping together beneficial bacteria from human feces. This genus has later been described as being defined by default, such that its members cannot be classified into other closely related genera, including Propionibacterium, Lactobacillus, Bifidobacterium, or Actinomyces, based on metabolic differences. This means that organisms within this genus may be more similar to organisms in other genera than to organisms within the genus, but ultimately each could not be classified in other genera due to a fundamental metabolic difference. The genus Eubacterium is also closely related to the Clostridium genus, and thus the two share many phenotypic similarities. Due to the high heterogeneity of the Eubacterium genus, it has been proposed to reclassify the species in this genus, and this reclassification process has already begun. A 2019 study aimed at reclassifying species within the Bacteroidetes phylum used 16s rRNA data processed through the Genome BLAST Distance Phylogeny (GBDP) program to generate a sister group of a clade comprising E. eligens, Lachnospira multipara, and Lactobacillus rogosae. This finding prompted the potential renaming of E. eligens to Lachnospira eligens.

=== Discovery ===
Eubacterium eligens was first discovered by Holdeman and Moore in 1974 in human fecal samples. Holdeman and Moore worked in the Anaerobe Lab at Virginia Tech where they were able to isolate and define almost 200 new microbes from the human intestinal tract. E. eligens was isolated and described alongside 12 other unknown anaerobic species after being discovered during studies of the human fecal flora. Holdeman and Moore named the new bacteria with eligens, meaning choosy, due to its poor growth in the absence of fermentable carbohydrates.

=== Isolation and characterization ===
Isolation was done using a modified version of the Hungate roll-tube method, as well as the traditional method of plates and broth in anaerobic jars. Characterization was based on growth on or reaction to 32 different substrates by the isolated bacterium. Some defining characteristics included motility, as well as unique fermentation products from peptone yeast (PY)-glucose, PY-pyruvate, and PY-gluconate media, which mainly included high amounts of formate and acetate and low amounts of lactate as the fermentation products from each of those carbon sources. E. eligens also has a GC content of 36%. Holdeman and Moore described the differentiation of E. eligens from closely related species by the following characteristics: the small amount of lactate as a fermentation product, presence of motility, poor growth without fermentable carbohydrates, differences in cellular morphology, and lack of hydrogen production.

=== Physiology & metabolism ===
Eubacterium eligens exhibits optimal growth at 37 °C but is able to grow well up to a temperature of 45 °C, while no growth occurs when temperatures reach 30 °C or below. This makes E. eligens mesophilic and the human gut provides optimal temperature conditions for growth. Growth is only observed when fermentable carbons were available in the growth media. Colonies grown on rumen fluid-glucose-cellobiose agar (RGCA) complete medium for 5 days had a diameter of 0.5-1mm, were tan in color, and lenticular in shape. Colonies grown in anaerobic conditions on blood agar plates were non-hemolytic and their morphology was white, shiny, circular, entire, convex, smooth, and translucent.

According to Duttaroy, Firmicutes such as E. eligens metabolize polysaccharides such as pectin and the major fermentation products include acetate and formate. BacDive establishes that E. eligens performs arginine and urea hydrolysis, nitrate reduction, and utilizes tryptophan as an energy source.

What is known about the metabolism of E. eligens generally centers around its ability to break down carbohydrates, which makes it heterotrophic. Studies have shown that bacteria in the gut microbiota – which is where E. eligens can be found – interact with carbohydrates. In terms of testing the carbon acquisition of E. eligens specifically, other studies have shown this species outcompete other species in piglet fecal samples when piglets were fed sugar beet pulp as well as fructooligosaccharide, which were the only sources of carbon available to the gut microbiota. Additional research has also supported that this bacteria metabolizes the pectin in sugar beets and apples, which is a polysaccharide often found in fruit. Overall, not only does this indicate the metabolic functions of the bacteria, this research also illustrates the potential role it plays in the gut as a heterotrophic fermenter. Another role it plays is part of the CDP-diacylglycerol biosynthesis pathway, also in the gut microbiota. This is a molecule that is used to create lipids.

Because of its metabolism, many of the genes found and studied in E. eligens focus on fermentation of carbohydrates. It has several genes that encode for enzymes that are intended to break down various carbohydrates, especially pectin. Additionally, it has genes for an ortholog for the endonuclease Cpf1: EeCpf1. This cleaves DNA and has been used in research as a gene silencing tool. It also exhibits more cleavage when associated with a metal cofactor.

=== Genomics ===
Eubacterium eligens has a total of 2,723 genes which constitute 2,613 protein genes, 66 RNA genes, and 44 pseudogenes. It consists of 2.83 Mb and can undergo 959 enzymatic reactions. According to taxonomical data and classification under NCBI, whole genome sequencing was done in part by Mahowald et al. The closest neighbor to E. eligens is E. rectale, and both genome sequences are used together to sequence newly identified microorganisms. The Eubacterium species E. rectale, E. hallii, E. ventriosum, E. eligens, E. coprostanoligenes, and E. limosum are the most closely related to one another with DNA G+C content of the genus varying from 30 to 57 percent. It is difficult to identify E. rectale, E. eligens, and E. biforme using traditional culture methods. Kageyama and Benno found success in using nested PCR, a universal primer pair, and subsequent amplification of the bacterial sample using species-specific primers.

Scientific interest has been spurred by the isolation and genetic sequencing of E. eligens, which has revealed the significance of this organism for human health. The genome of E. eligens has been sequenced and analyzed by researchers using modern methods. To produce high-quality genome drafts, one study concentrated on isolating and sequencing uncultured microbes, such as E. eligens, observed in metagenomic shotgun sequencing of 16s rRNA. The scientists used an assembler known as Athena, which builds high-quality genome drafts from a single shotgun sequencing operation by using barcode information from read clouds.

== Applications ==
Eubacterium eligens emerges as a key component of gut microbiota health with potential implications for battling major health challenges such as obesity, metabolic syndrome, diabetes, and cardiovascular diseases. This species demonstrates a strongly negative correlation with abdominal visceral fat area (VFA) and is associated with a decrease in Type 1 Diabetes (T1D) risk. Furthermore, it has been linked to lower triglyceride levels and positively correlates with HDL-C levels, emphasizing its potential role in mitigating metabolic syndrome and cardiovascular risk inherent with obesity. The notable connections between reduced VFA, decreased T1D risk, and improved lipid profiles underscores its potential as a critical ally in managing these conditions.

Moreover, the ability of E. eligens to produce anti-inflammatory compounds opens promising therapeutic avenues for treating inflammatory disorders, supporting its potential as a beneficial probiotic.

Research has also revealed that Eubacterium species, including E. eligens and E. rectale, positively impact health markers such as reduced frailty and improved cognitive ability, alongside an increase in the production of short branched chain fatty acid.

Understanding E. eligens paves the way to novel probiotic and therapeutic interventions, highlighting its significance beyond the scientific community to potentially transform public health approaches to diet, obesity management, and immune regulation, offering new horizons in preventative and curative health measures.

== Ecological role in human health ==
Not much is known about the role of E. eligens, but experiments have shown that it is prolific in the colon. It has been reported that several human health conditions are associated with gut dysbiosis, which can modify the abundance of Eubacterium in the gut microbiome. Maintaining gut homeostasis and systemic health requires understanding the diversity and makeup of the gut microbiota. The population changes of Eubacterium in the gut depend on several factors, including age and nutrition. Studies have indicated a significant correlation between the prevalence of E. eligens in the gut microbiome and specific dietary fibers. Zhang et al. state that fiber is fermented by normal microbiota to make beneficial metabolites such as short-chain fatty acids (SCFA), which support mucosal intestine linings and reduce inflammation. These findings highlight the relationship between E. eligens and dietary practices. Despite gut microbiota performing many of the same functions, using taxon-centric analysis to classify species leads to high dimensionality because of the vast complexity of strains. Eubacterium is one of the many possible gut microbial taxa that degrade dietary fiber, though E. eligens is one of the only Firmicutes to degrade pectin.

Eubacterium eligens has been found to have a strong correlation to positive cardiometabolic and healthy diet indicators. It also has been associated with higher rates of anti-inflammatory compounds, as stated before, and lower rates of insulin release. They have also been found to have a negative association with stomach fat, meaning the more E. eligens one has in their microbiome, the less visceral fat they tend to have.
