= Ileibacterium massiliense =

Scientific classification
- Domain: Bacteria
- Kingdom: Bacillati
- Phylum: Bacillota
- Class: Erysipelotrichia
- Order: Erysipelotrichales
- Family: Erysipelotrichaceae
- Genus: Ileibacterium
- Species: I. massiliense

Binomial name
- Ileibacterium massiliense Mailhe et al. 2017

Type strain
- CSUR P3115, DSM 103486, Marseille-P3115

Species of bacterium

Ileibacterium massiliense is a bacterium from the genus Ileibacterium which has been isolated from the ileum of a human.
