= Mediterraneibacter gnavus =

Scientific classification
- Domain: Bacteria
- Kingdom: Bacillati
- Phylum: Bacillota
- Class: Clostridia
- Order: Eubacteriales
- Family: Lachnospiraceae
- Genus: Mediterraneibacter
- Species: M. gnavus

Binomial name
- Mediterraneibacter gnavus (Moore et al. 1976) Togo et al. 2023

Synonyms
- Ruminococcus gnavus Moore et al. 1976 (Approved Lists 1980)

Species of bacterium

Mediterraneibacter gnavus (formerly Ruminococcus gnavus) is a species of anaerobic, Gram-positive bacterium commonly found in the human gut microbiota. It is currently classified within the family Lachnospiraceae within the class Clostridia, following reclassification based on the phylogenetic and 16S rRNA gene analyses that distinguished it from earlier Ruminococcacae groupings.

Mediterraneibacter gnavus is present in both infants and adults and is considered a normal component of the gut microbiome. Some strains of this bacterium are capable of degrading mucins and fermenting carbohydrates, producing metabolites such as short-chain fatty acids that contribute to gut function.

However, an increase in abundance of M. gnavus has been associated with gastrointestinal disorders, including Crohn's disease and irritable bowel syndrome. Certain strains have also been found to produce inflammatory molecules and influence host metabolic pathways, highlighting their role in both normal gut function and disease.

Because of its dual role as both a common gut microbe and a potential contributor to disease, Mediterraneibacter gnavus has become an important subject of research in microbiology and human health.

== Taxonomy and phylogeny ==
Other members of the Bacillota phylum may be found in a variety of environments, such as soil, however they are similar to M. gnavus as they share characteristics such as being Gram-positive, having a coccoid (round) cell structure, and a relatively low G-C content (under 50%). The average Mediterraneibacter gnavus genome is about 3.46±0.46 megabase pairs, with about 42.73±0.33% being GC base pairs; however, these numbers vary by strain. In 2008, 16S rRNA sequencing was used to further classify the Ruminococcus genus into Lachnospiraceae and Ruminococcaceae families. The Lachnospiraceae family contains microbes that are obligate anaerobes that may or may not form bacterial spores (in this case, M. gnavus does not). Mediterraneibacter gnavus was historically classified in the genus Ruminococcus, but phylogenetic analyses have led to its reclassification into the genus Mediterraneibacter. The Mediterraneibacter genus contains other anaerobic, Gram-positive, non-motile bacteria often found in human gut microbiomes. Other human gut bacteria in the Ruminococcus genus that have been reclassified to Mediterreneibacter include Ruminococcus torques and Ruminococcus lactaris, making these close phylogenetic neighbors to M. gnavus. Rumiococcus gnavus and Mediterraneibacter gnavus are both names for this same organism, and both are commonly used in literature. Mediterraneibacter gnavus has been deemed the most accurate description based on the genome analyses, but Ruminococcus gnavus is still widely used for simplicity and tradition.

== Discovery and history ==
W.E.C. Moore and Lillian Holdeman were the first to discover and isolate M. gnavus in 1974 when they collected fecal matter from Japanese-Hawaiian men ages 60 to 80. The microbes from the feces were made into smears where direct microscopic clump counting occurred, and then smears were later heat-fixed and Gram-stained. In 1976, Moore and Holdeman published another paper reporting on the specific characteristics of the microbe. A colony was again taken from feces and then inoculated and incubated for five days without oxygen. Mediterraneibacter gnavus was found to be Gram-positive and anaerobic. Additionally, the microbiologists discovered M. gnavus could not form spores and was nonmotile except in certain cases where one to three flagella were present.

== Physiology and metabolism ==
Some strains of M. gnavus can degrade mucins (glycoproteins that are present in mucus) and human milk oligosaccharides. Mucin degradation depends on whether the strain carries the genes to synthesize intramolecular trans-sialidase enzymes, which can cleave bonds in mucus to release sialic acid that can be used for other processes by the microbe. Some strains can also ferment carbohydrates such as fucose and glucose, and as a result, they can release short-chain fatty acids, including ethanol, acetate, and propionate. The different strains' ability to degrade different molecules depends on genes present in their genome that code for different enzymes. This microbe has been found to grow in the human gut, and age doesn't seem to determine whether it is present, as it has been found in both adults and infants. Researchers have found evidence that a high amount of these microbes in the digestive system is correlated with Crohn's disease and irritable bowel syndrome.

== Genomics ==
Mediterraneibacter gnavus demonstrates substantial genomic diversity at the strain level, contributing to its varied roles within the human gut microbiome. Comparative genomic analyses of over 150 genomes revealed that M. gnavus exhibits extensive intra-species genetic divergence, with genomes organized into multiple phylogenetic clusters and a relatively small core genome, indicating high variability among strains.

The average genome size of M. gnavus is approximately 3.46 Mbp with a G+C content of about 47%, values consistent with its classification within the Lachnospiracae family.

Pan-genome analysis, which examines the total set of genes present across all strains of a species, has shown that a large proportion of genes belong to the accessory rather than the core genome, reflecting the organism's adaptability and functional diversity across strains. The core genome consists of genes shared by all strains and is associated with essential cellular functions, while the accessory genome contains genes present in only some strains, often linked to specialized functions such as environmental adaptation or host interaction.

Genomic studies have also identified genes associated with antibiotic resistance and virulence factors in certain strains, including tetracycline resistance genes and genes involved in capsular polysaccharide biosynthesis.

In addition, specific biosynthetic gene clusters have been identified that enable M. gnavus to produce complex polysaccharides, including inflammatory Glucomannan molecules that can stimulate host immune responses.

The genomic variability supports the observation that different strains of M. gnavus may have distinct functional roles, ranging from commensal activity to potential contributions to disease.

== Ecology and role in disease ==
Mediterraneibacter gnavus is a common anaerobic bacterium that resides in the human gut microbiota, where it typically functions as part of the normal microbial community in both infants and adults. Its abundance varies between individuals and may be influenced by factors such as diet, host characteristics, and overall microbiome composition. Under healthy conditions, M. gnavus contributes to the degradation of complex carbohydrates and mucins.

Despite its role as a commensal organism, increased abundance of M. gnavus has been associated with gastrointestinal disorders, including inflammatory bowel disease (IBD) and Crohn's disease.Certain strains have been reported to be more prevalent in individuals with active disease, suggesting that strain-level variation may influence their functional role in the gut.

One mechanism linking M. gnavus to disease involves the production of inflammatory polysaccharides. Some strains produce glucorhamnan, which has been shown to stimulate host immune responses and promote inflammation.This activity may contribute to the disruption of intestinal homeostasis in susceptible individuals.

Genomic analyses indicate that M. gnavus possesses genes involved in carbohydrate metabolism and mucin degradation, which may support its adaptation to the gut environment. These functional capabilities may allow certain strains to persist under altered microbial conditions in the gut.

Mediterraneibacter gnavus exhibits a context-dependent role within the gut microbiome, functioning as a commensal organism under normal conditions while also being associated with disease in specific contexts.
