= Breznakia pachnodae =

Scientific classification
- Domain: Bacteria
- Kingdom: Bacillati
- Phylum: Bacillota
- Class: Erysipelotrichia
- Order: Erysipelotrichales
- Family: Erysipelotrichaceae
- Genus: Breznakia
- Species: B. pachnodae

Binomial name
- Breznakia pachnodae Tegtmeier et al. 2016

Type strain
- DSM 16784, Pei041, Pei061, JCM 30191

Species of bacterium

Breznakia pachnodae is a Gram-positive and obligately anaerobic bacterium from the genus Breznakia which has been isolated from the gut of the insect larva Pachnoda ephippiata in Germany.
