= Breznakia blatticola =

Scientific classification
- Domain: Bacteria
- Kingdom: Bacillati
- Phylum: Bacillota
- Class: Erysipelotrichia
- Order: Erysipelotrichales
- Family: Erysipelotrichaceae
- Genus: Breznakia
- Species: B. blatticola

Binomial name
- Breznakia blatticola Tegtmeier et al. 2016

Type strain
- DSM 28867, JCM 30190, strain ErySL

Species of bacterium

Breznakia blatticola is a Gram-positive and obligately anaerobic bacterium from the genus Breznakia which has been isolated from the hindgut of the cockroach Shelfordella lateralis in Germany.
