= Absiella argi =

Scientific classification
- Domain: Bacteria
- Kingdom: Bacillati
- Phylum: Bacillota
- Class: Erysipelotrichia
- Order: Erysipelotrichales
- Family: Erysipelotrichaceae
- Genus: Absiella
- Species: A. argi

Binomial name
- Absiella argi Paek et al. 2017

Type strain
- N6H1-5

Species of bacterium

Absiella argi is a Gram-positive bacterium from the genus Absiella which has been isolated from the feces of a dog.
