= Bulleidia =

Scientific classification
- Domain: Bacteria
- Kingdom: Bacillati
- Phylum: Bacillota
- Class: Erysipelotrichia
- Order: Erysipelotrichales
- Family: Erysipelotrichaceae
- Genus: Bulleidia; Downes et al. 2000

Type species
- Bulleidia extructa Downes et al. 2000

Species
- Bulleidia extructa

Genus of bacteria

Bulleidia is a Gram-positive, non-spore-forming, anaerobic and non-motile genus from the family Erysipelotrichaceae, with one known species (Bulleidia extructa).

== Phylogeny ==
The currently accepted taxonomy is based on the List of Prokaryotic names with Standing in Nomenclature (LPSN) and National Center for Biotechnology Information (NCBI)

16S rRNA based LTP_08_2023

- - Stecheria intestinalis
  - - Solobacterium moorei
    - Bulleidia extructa

120 marker proteins based GTDB 08-RS214

- Bulleidia
  - - Stecheria intestinalis Wylensek et al. 2021 (incl. "Anaerolactibacter massiliensis" Togo et al. 2019)
    - "Galactobacillus timonensis" (Togo et al. 2018) Togo et al. 2019
  - - "Lactimicrobium massiliense" Togo et al. 2019
    - - Solobacterium moorei Kageyama & Benno 2000
      - B. extructa Downes et al. 2000
