= Allobaculum stercoricanis =

Scientific classification
- Domain: Bacteria
- Kingdom: Bacillati
- Phylum: Bacillota
- Class: Erysipelotrichia
- Order: Erysipelotrichales
- Family: Erysipelotrichaceae
- Genus: Allobaculum
- Species: A. stercoricanis

Binomial name
- Allobaculum stercoricanis Greetham et al. 2006

Type strain
- CCUG 45212, DSM 13633

Species of bacterium

Allobaculum stercoricanis is an anaerobic, non-spore-forming and rod-shaped bacterium from the genus Allobaculum which has been isolated from feces from a dog.´
