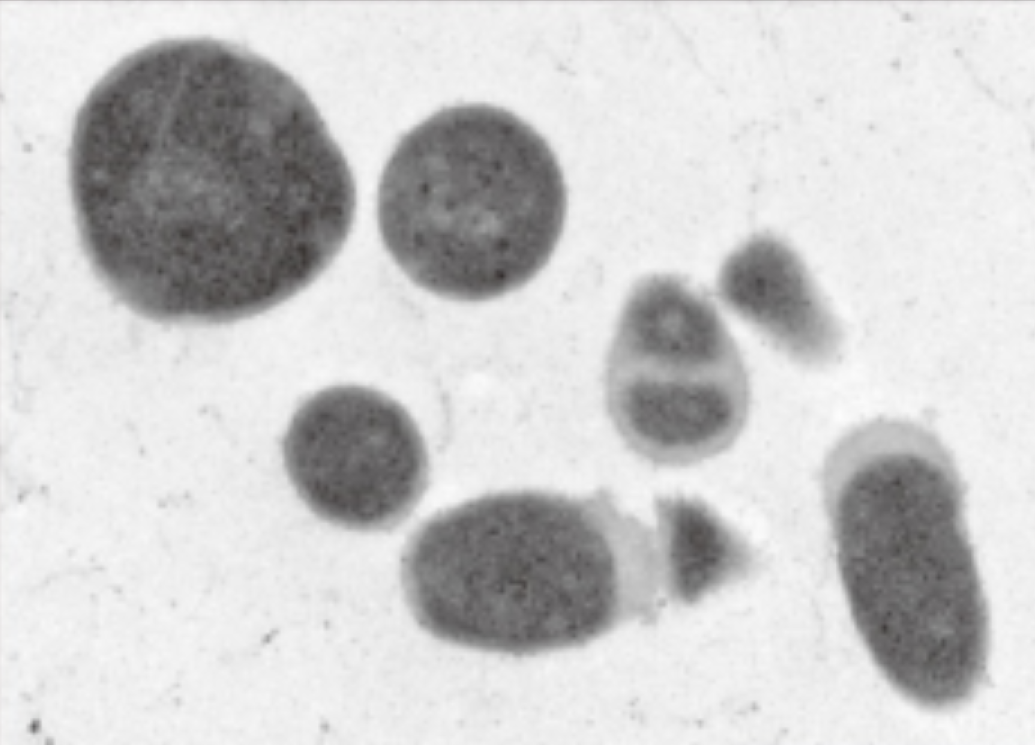
- Transmission Electron Microscopy of S. moorei. Scale bar: 1 µm.

Scientific classification
- Domain: Bacteria
- Kingdom: Bacillati
- Phylum: Bacillota
- Class: Erysipelotrichia
- Order: Erysipelotrichales
- Family: Erysipelotrichaceae
- Genus: Solobacterium
- Species: S. moorei

Binomial name
- Solobacterium moorei Kageyama and Benno 2000

= Solobacterium moorei =

Species of bacterium

Solobacterium moorei is a Gram-positive, obligate anaerobic bacillus that contributes to halitosis. This bacterium is non-spore forming and commonly found in the oral and intestinal human microbiota. The species was previously known as Bulleidia extructa and B. moorei, in the family Erysipelotrichaceae before it was reclassified into a new genus. Kageyama and Benno identified the first strain in human feces as an unclassified Clostridium group RCA59 in 2000.

== Cell structure and molecular components ==
Solobacterium moorei is a non-motile, rod-shaped bacterium approximately 0.2 μm in width and 0.4-0.7 μm in length. It is frequently found in pairs or chains without flagella.

Solobacterium moorei have hydrophobic adhesins to attach to the lipophilic molecules of oral epithelial cells. These adhesins allow them to form biofilms and contribute to halitosis. Green tea extract, containing epigallocatechin-3-gallate (EGCG), inhibits S. moorei biofilm formation and reduces its ability to attach to oral epithelial cells.

== Genetic composition ==
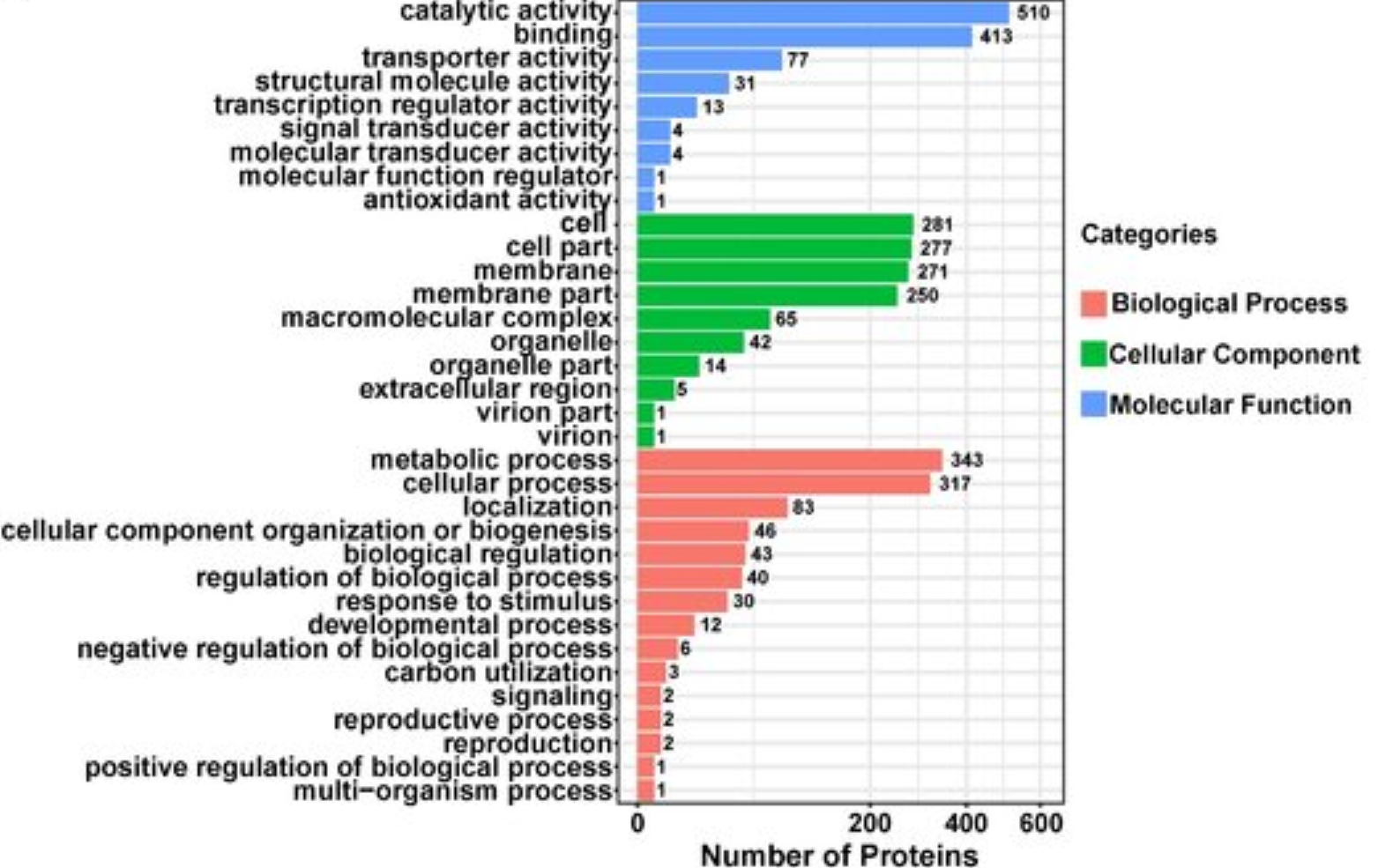
Gene Ontology Classification of S. moorei Proteins

The sequenced genome of S. moorei is a single linear chromosome spanning 2,615,268 base pairs with a GC content of 37.2%.

== Metabolism and molecular pathways ==
Most strains can ferment fructose, galactose, glucose, maltose, and ribose and hydrolyze esculin. They exhibit α-galactosidase and α-glucosidase activity to catalyze the breakdown of carbohydrates into simpler sugars. S. moorei produces acetic acid in glucose fermentation and volatile sulfur compounds (VSCs) in anaerobic respiration. Additionally, β-Galactosidase activity is present in the bacterium, which is directly associated with oral malodor when present in the saliva due to volatile compound release.

Solobacterium moorei likely has a homolog of the Methionine Gamma-Lyase (MegL) enzyme, which can produce hydrogen sulfide. This enzyme acts as a catalyst to degrade amino acids containing sulfur, leading to the formation of volatile sulfur compounds.

== Pathogenesis ==
Solobacterium moorei is an opportunistic pathogen, and infections outside of halitosis are often observed in patients with cancer or a suppressed immune system. This pathogen has contributed to bloodstream and wound infections, with bacteremia as the most frequently reported infection caused by S. moorei. Osteoarticular and skin and soft tissue infections (SSTIs) have also been reported in association with this bacteria.

== Tumor cell signaling ==
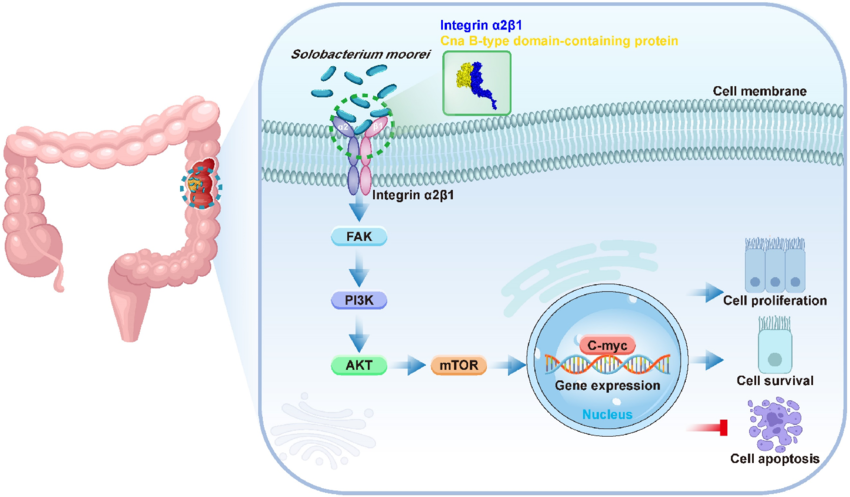
How Solobacterium moorei promotes colorectal cancer tumor progression through the Integrin α2/β1-PI3K-AKT-mTOR-C-Myc signaling pathway.

High concentrations of S. moorei were found in colorectal adenomatous polyp tissue, which positively correlated with inflammation in the region. Research suggests this bacteria promotes the disruption of the intestinal barrier and progression of adenomatous polyps due to inflammation, a risk factor for colorectal cancer.

Solobacterium moorei attached to HT-29 colorectal cancer cells and stimulated cell proliferation. This bacteria promotes colorectal cancer growth by binding to integrin α2 and integrin β1 on tumor cells through its Cna B-type domain-containing protein. This activates the PI3K-AKT-mTOR-C-myc signaling pathway via phosphorylated Focal Adhesion Kinase (phospho-FAK), leading to tumor progression due to promotion of cell survival and reduction of cell apoptosis. Small interfering RNA (siRNA) was used to silence the genes integrin α2 and integrin β1, reducing the expression of the integrin subunits. Blocking integrin α2/β1 stopped S. moorei's cancer-promoting effects in lab and mice studies.

== Identification techniques ==
Solobacterium moorei is a slow-growing bacterium and is difficult to cultivate. Traditional bacterial phenotypic testing cannot identify this bacterium accurately. The only truly reliable method to recognize this bacterium is 16S rRNA gene sequencing; however, Matrix-Assisted Laser Desorption/Ionization-Time of Flight Mass Spectrometry (MALDI-TOF MS) is a more accessible method. Additionally, DNA probe assays can detect S. moorei strains.
