= Ileibacterium valens =

Scientific classification
- Domain: Bacteria
- Kingdom: Bacillati
- Phylum: Bacillota
- Class: Erysipelotrichia
- Order: Erysipelotrichales
- Family: Erysipelotrichaceae
- Genus: Ileibacterium
- Species: I. valens

Binomial name
- Ileibacterium valens Cox et al. 2017

Type strain
- ATCC TSD-63, DSM 103668, NYU-BL-A3

Synonyms
- Ileibacterium lipovorans

Species of bacterium

Ileibacterium valens is a Gram-positive bacterium from the genus Ileibacterium which has been isolated from the intestine of a murine from New York City in the United States.
