= Absiella =

Scientific classification
- Domain: Bacteria
- Kingdom: Bacillati
- Phylum: Bacillota
- Class: Erysipelotrichia
- Order: Erysipelotrichales
- Family: Erysipelotrichaceae
- Genus: Absiella; Paek et al. 2020

Type species
- Absiella argi Paek et al. 2020

Species
- Absiella argi; "Absiella tortuosa"

Genus of bacteria

Absiella is a genus of bacteria from the family Erysipelotrichaceae.
