= Anaerorhabdus =

Scientific classification
- Domain: Bacteria
- Kingdom: Bacillati
- Phylum: Bacillota
- Class: Erysipelotrichia
- Order: Erysipelotrichales
- Family: Erysipelotrichaceae
- Genus: Anaerorhabdus; Shah and Collins 1986

Type species
- Anaerorhabdus furcosus (Veillon & Zuber 1898) Shah & Collins 1986

Species
- Anaerorhabdus furcosa

Genus of bacteria

Anaerorhabdus is a Gram-negative, anaerobic, non-spore-forming and non-motile genus of bacteria from the family Erysipelotrichaceae.
