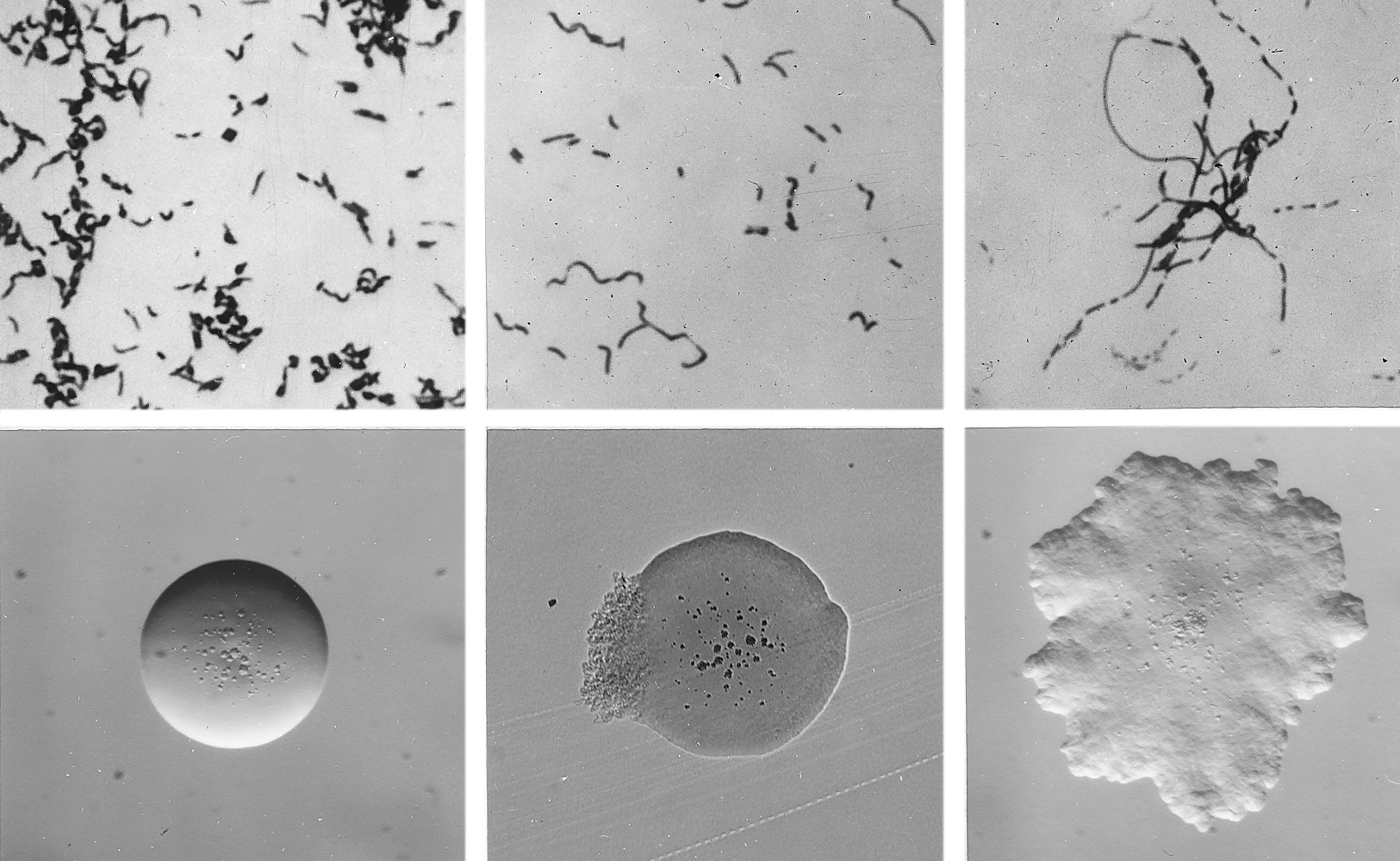
- Cellular and colonial morphology of Erysipelothrix rhusiopathiae

Scientific classification
- Domain: Bacteria
- Kingdom: Bacillati
- Phylum: Bacillota
- Class: Erysipelotrichia
- Order: Erysipelotrichales
- Family: Erysipelotrichaceae
- Genus: Erysipelothrix
- Species: E. rhusiopathiae

Binomial name
- Erysipelothrix rhusiopathiae Migula, 1900

= Erysipelothrix rhusiopathiae =

Species of pathogenic bacterium

Erysipelothrix rhusiopathiae is a Gram-positive, catalase-negative, rod-shaped, non-spore-forming, nonacid-fast, nonmotile bacterium. Distributed worldwide, E. rhusiopathiae is primarily considered an animal pathogen, causing the disease known as erysipelas that may affect a wide range of animals. Pigs, turkeys and laying hens are most commonly affected, but cases have been reported in other mammals, birds, fish, and reptiles. In pigs, the disease is known as diamond skin disease. The bacterium can also cause zoonotic infections in humans, called erysipeloid. The human disease called erysipelas is not caused by E. rhusiopathiae, but by various members of the genus Streptococcus.

== History ==
Erysipelothrix rhusiopathiae was first isolated by Robert Koch in 1876. A few years later the bacterium was recognised as the cause of erysipelas in pigs and in 1884 the organism was first established as a human pathogen. In 1909, the genus was named Erysipelothrix. In 1918 the name Erysipelothrix rhusiopathiae was introduced and in 1920 it was designated as the type species of the genus.

== Epidemiology ==
Erysipelothrix rhusiopathiae may be isolated from soil, food scraps, and water contaminated by infected animals. It can survive in soil for several weeks. In pig faeces, the survival period of this bacterium ranges from 1 to 5 months. Erysipeloid is transmitted by several animals, particularly pigs, in which the disease (very common in the past) has several names (swine erysipelas in English, rouget du porc in French and mal rossino in Italian). Urticaria-like lesions, arthralgia, arthritis, endocarditis, and sepsis are the most characteristic features of swine erysipelas. Other animals that can transmit the infection are sheep, rabbits, chickens, turkeys, ducks, emus, scorpion fish, and lobsters. Erysipeloid is an occupational disease, mainly found in animal breeders, veterinarians, slaughterhouse workers, furriers, butchers, fishermen, fishmongers, housewives, cooks, and grocers. One epidemic of erysipeloid was described in workers involved in manufacturing buttons from animal bone. The disease is of economic importance to the pig industries of North America, Europe, Asia, and Australia.

== Clinical disease ==
=== Humans ===
In humans, E. rhusiopathiae infections most commonly present in a mild cutaneous form known as erysipeloid. Less commonly, it can result in sepsis; this scenario is often associated with endocarditis. Erysipeloid, also named in the past Rosenbach's disease, Baker–Rosenbach disease, and pseudoerysipelas, is a bacterial infection of the skin caused by traumatic penetration of E. rhusiopathiae. In one instance, a case report identified E. rhusiopathiae as a sole pathogen causing periprosthetic joint infection in the knee of an immunocompromised farmer.

It occurs most commonly as an occupational disease. The disease is characterized clinically by an erythematous oedema, with well-defined and raised borders, usually localized to the back of one hand and/or fingers. The palms, forearms, arms, face, and legs are rarely involved. Vesicular, bullous, and erosive lesions may also be present. The lesion may be asymptomatic or accompanied by mild pruritus, pain, and fever.

=== Animals ===
Erysipelothrix rhusiopathiae may infect a wide range of animals, with or without causing the clinical disease that in animals is termed erysipelas.

==== Pigs ====
In pigs, three forms of erysipelas may be seen; acute, subacute or chronic. The acute form is characterised by high fever, anorexia, depression and death of one or more animals. Also, diamond-shaped cutaneous lesions may be seen, these are pathognomonic for erysipelas in pigs. During subacute erysipelas, similar but milder signs than in the acute form are seen. The chronic form may follow from acute or subacute cases or subclinical infections. The chronic form is mostly characterised by arthritis but sudden deaths, due to valvular lesions in the heart, may occur.

==== Poultry ====
The bacterium has been isolated from a wide range of avian species and differences in susceptibility depending on species have been suggested. Erysipelas outbreaks have been reported in almost all poultry species. Historically, erysipelas has been considered a disease of significant importance primarily in turkeys. However, an increasing number of outbreaks in laying hen flocks have been reported in several countries. Signs seen during an outbreak of erysipelas in a laying hen flock include sudden onset of high mortality and egg production losses.

=== Muskox ===
Due to unregulated hunting of muskox the species was almost wiped out in the late 19th century. However, by 1917 regulations were in place and the herds began to recover to such an extent that regulated hunting was permitted in the 1980s. By the 1990s hunters were permitted to take 10,000 muskox on Banks Island alone and in 2001 it was estimated that there were more than 68,000 muskox on the island making it the largest population in the world. However, since then the numbers have dropped by 70% due to E. rhusiopathiae.

== Virulence factors ==
Various virulence factors have been suggested as being involved in the pathogenicity of E. rhusiopathiae. The presence of a hyaluronidase and neuraminidase has been recognized, and neuraminidase was shown to play a significant role in bacterial attachment and subsequent invasion into host cells. The role of hyaluronidase in the disease process is controversial. The presence of a heat-labile capsule has been reported as important in virulence.

== Diagnosis ==
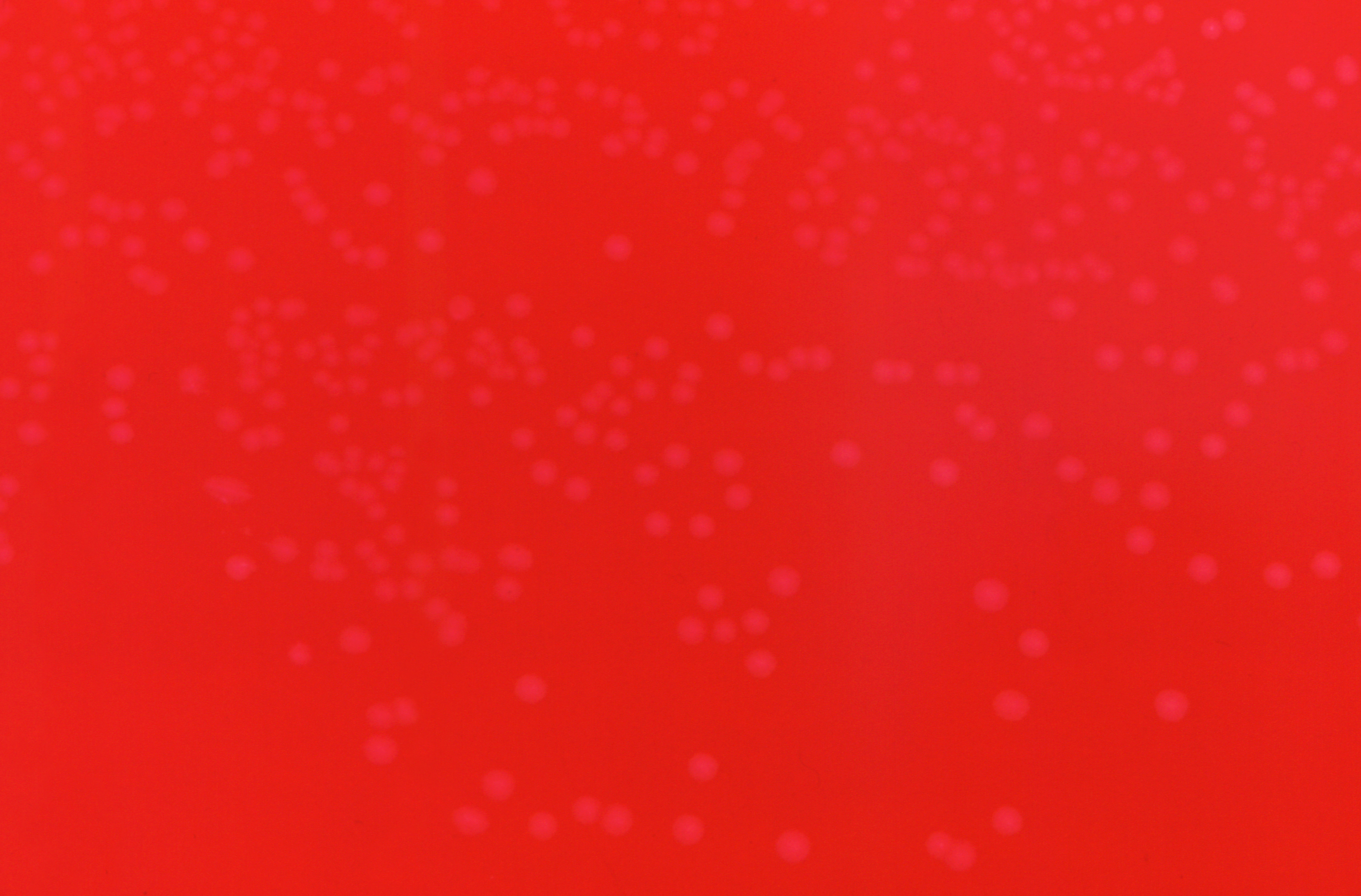
Blood agar plate culture of E. rhusiopathiae

=== Isolation ===
Traditionally, culture methods for the isolation of E. rhusiopathiae involve the use of selective and enrichment media. Commercially available blood culture media are satisfactory for primary isolation from blood, since E. rhusiopathiae is not particularly fastidious. A number of selective media for the isolation of Erysipelothrix have been described, also. A commonly used medium is Erysipelothrix selective broth (ESB), a nutrient broth containing serum, tryptose, kanamycin, neomycin, and vancomycin. Modified blood azide medium (MBA) is a selective agar containing sodium azide and horse blood or serum. Packer's medium is a selective medium for grossly contaminated specimens, which contains sodium azide and crystal violet. Bohm's medium uses sodium azide, kanamycin, phenol, and water blue. Shimoji's selective enrichment broth contains tryptic soy broth, Tween 80, tris-aminomethane, crystal violet, and sodium azide.

=== Species identification ===
Conventional species identification is based on colony morphology, Gram-staining and biochemical tests. Colonies are small with a narrow zone of alpha hemolysis on blood agar plates. Laboratory smears show Gram-positive rods (though Gram stain has low sensitivity for this microbe). It is nonmotile, catalase-negative, microaerophilic, capnophilic, and non-spore-forming. It can also produce H_{2}S (gas), which is a unique characteristic for a Gram-positive bacillus. Acid is produced from glucose, fructose, galactose, and lactose, but not from maltose, xylose, and mannitol. Sucrose is fermented by most strains of E. tonsillarum, but not by E. rhusiopathiae. Hydrogen sulfide H_{2}S is produced by 95% of strains of Erysipelothrix species as demonstrated on triple sugar iron (TSI) agar. E. rhusiopathiae can be differentiated from other Gram-positive bacilli, in particular, from Arcanobacterium (Corynebacterium) pyogenes and Arcanobacterium (Corynebacterium) haemolyticum, which are hemolytic on blood agar and do not produce hydrogen sulfide in TSI agar slants, and from Listeria monocytogenes, which is catalase positive, motile, and sensitive to neomycin. Rapid identification of E. rhusiopathiae can be achieved with the API Coryne System. It is a commercial strip system based on a number of biochemical reactions for the identification of coryneform bacteria and related genera, including E. rhusiopathiae. The system permits reliable and rapid identification of bacteria and has been considered to be a good alternative to traditional biochemical methods.

=== Other assays ===
Several polymerase chain reaction (PCR) based methods have also been developed for detection of E. rhusiopathiae. Laboratory investigations of humans may reveal leucocytosis, slightly increased serum c-globulins, and an increase in inflammatory markers (erythrocyte sedimentation rate, C-reactive protein, and a-1 acid glycoprotein).

More recently, commercially available microbiologic testing based on targeted next-generation sequencing (NGS) for universal identification of bacteria and fungi was reportedly used to confirm a diagnosis of E. rhusiopathiae suspected to have caused periprosthetic joint infection. As implemented in that instance by MicroGen DX (Lubbock, TX), E. rhusiopathiae could be detected by targeted amplification and sequencing of the 16S rRNA gene which is useful for broad characterization of bacterial pathogens in a clinical sample. The method may be especially beneficial for rapid identification or confirmation of atypical pathogens in human infection such as Erysipelothrix.

== Treatment ==
=== Humans ===
Penicillin is the treatment of choice for both disease states in humans. E. rhusiopathiae is sensitive in vitro and in vivo mainly to penicillins, but also to cephalosporins (cefotaxime, ceftriaxone), tetracyclines (chlortetracycline, oxytetracycline), quinolones (ciprofloxacin, pefloxacin), clindamycin, erythromycin, imipenem, and piperacillin. It is resistant to vancomycin, chloramphenicol, daptomycin, gentamicin, netilmicin, polymyxin B, streptomycin, teicoplanin, tetracycline, and trimethoprim/sulfamethoxazole. Penicillins and cephalosporins are the first-line choices for treatment. A 7-day course is appropriate, and clinical improvement is usually observed 2–3 days after the beginning of the treatment.

=== Poultry ===
Only a few poultry isolates have been investigated for antimicrobial susceptibility. Penicillin is the drug of choice for treatment of poultry, however the disease may reoccur. Therefore, antibiotic treatment may be combined with vaccination.
