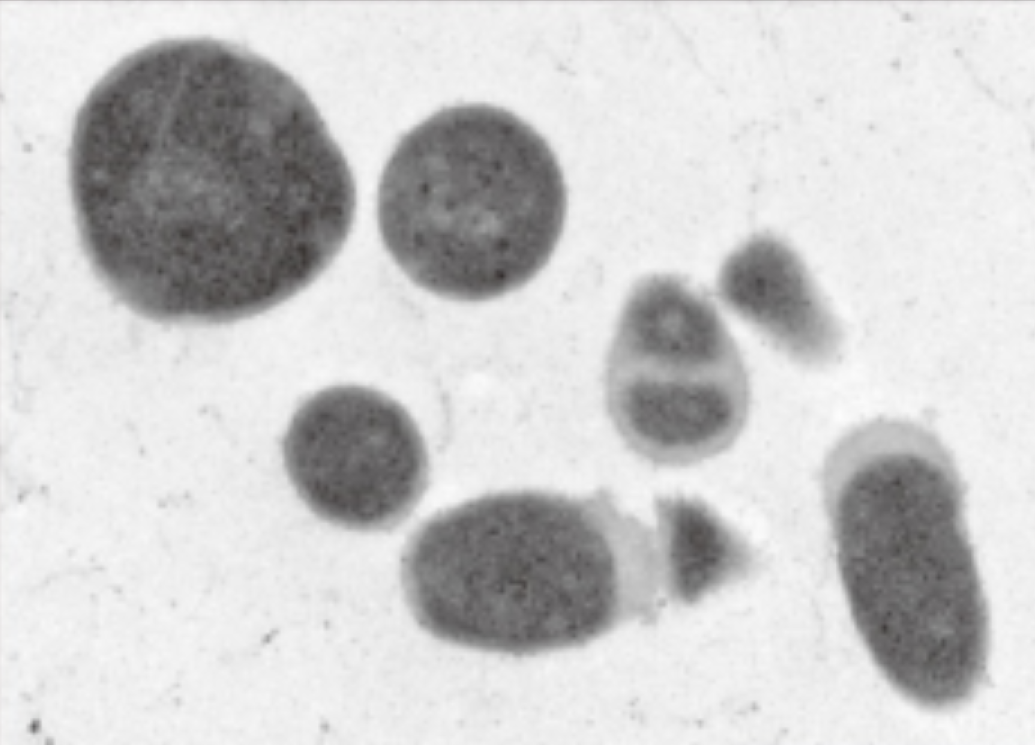
- Solobacterium moorei

Scientific classification
- Domain: Bacteria
- Kingdom: Bacillati
- Phylum: Bacillota
- Class: Erysipelotrichia
- Order: Erysipelotrichales
- Family: Erysipelotrichaceae
- Genus: Solobacterium; Kageyama and Benno 2000

Type species
- Solobacterium moorei Kageyama and Benno 2000

Species
- Solobacterium moorei

= Solobacterium =

Genus of anaerobic bacteria

Solobacterium is a Gram-positive, obligate anaerobic genus from the family Erysipelotrichaceae, with one known species, Solobacterium moorei. This genus has been found to be part of the salivary microbiome.
