= Holdemania filiformis =

Scientific classification
- Domain: Bacteria
- Kingdom: Bacillati
- Phylum: Bacillota
- Class: Erysipelotrichia
- Order: Erysipelotrichales
- Family: Erysipelotrichaceae
- Genus: Holdemania
- Species: H. filiformis

Binomial name
- Holdemania filiformis Willems et al. 1997

Type strain
- ATCC 51649, DSM 12042, J1-31B-1

Species of bacterium

Holdemania filiformis is a bacterium from the genus Holdemania which has been isolated from human feces.
