= Dubosiella =

Scientific classification
- Domain: Bacteria
- Kingdom: Bacillati
- Phylum: Bacillota
- Class: Erysipelotrichia
- Order: Erysipelotrichales
- Family: Erysipelotrichaceae
- Genus: Dubosiella; Cox et al. 2017

Type species
- Dubosiella newyorkensis Cox et al. 2017

Species
- Dubosiella muris; Dubosiella newyorkensis

Genus of bacteria

Dubosiella is a Gram-positive genus of bacteria from the family Erysipelotrichaceae. Dubosiella newyorkensis has been isolated from the intestinal content of a murine from New York City in the United States. Dubosiella is named after the American microbiologist René Dubos.

== Phylogeny ==
The currently accepted taxonomy is based on the List of Prokaryotic names with Standing in Nomenclature (LPSN) and National Center for Biotechnology Information (NCBI).

16S rRNA based LTP_10_2024

- Dubosiella
  D. newyorkensis

120 marker proteins based GTDB 09-RS220

- Dubosiella
  - D. muris Afrizal et al. 2023
  - D. newyorkensis Cox et al. 2017
