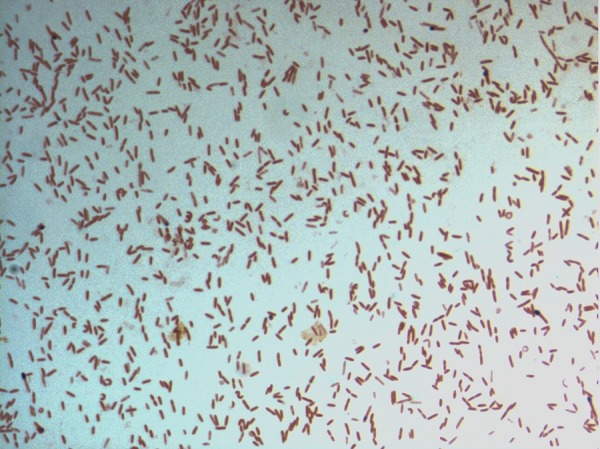
- Gram staining of Dielma fastidiosa strain JC13 ^{T}

Scientific classification
- Domain: Bacteria
- Kingdom: Bacillati
- Phylum: Bacillota
- Class: Erysipelotrichia
- Order: Erysipelotrichales
- Family: Erysipelotrichaceae
- Genus: Dielma; Ramasamy et al. 2016
- Species: D. fastidiosa

Binomial name
- Dielma fastidiosa Ramasamy et al. 2016

= Dielma =

Genus of bacteria

Dielma is a Gram-positive and anaerobic genus from the family of Erysipelotrichaceae with one known species, Dielma fastidiosa. Dielma fastidiosa has been isolated from human feces from Dielmo in Senegal.
