= Allobaculum =

Scientific classification
- Domain: Bacteria
- Kingdom: Bacillati
- Phylum: Bacillota
- Class: Erysipelotrichia
- Order: Erysipelotrichales
- Family: Erysipelotrichaceae
- Genus: Allobaculum; Greetham et al. 2006

Type species
- Allobaculum stercoricanis Greetham et al. 2006

Species
- Allobaculum fili; Allobaculum mucolyticum; Allobaculum stercoricanis

Genus of bacteria

Allobaculum is a Gram-positive, non-spore-forming bacterial, strictly anaerobic and non-motile genus from the family Erysipelotrichaceae, with known species Allobaculum stercoricanis and Allobaculum mucolyticum.

== Phylogeny ==
The currently accepted taxonomy is based on the List of Prokaryotic names with Standing in Nomenclature (LPSN) and National Center for Biotechnology Information (NCBI).

16S rRNA based LTP_10_2024

- Allobaculum
  - A. stercoricanis Greetham et al. 2006
  - - A. fili Van Muijlwijk et al. 2023
    - A. mucolyticum van Muijlwijk et al. 2023

120 marker proteins based GTDB 09-RS220

- Allobaculum
  - A. stercoricanis
  - - A. fili
    - A. mucolyticum
