= Lillian Haldeman Moore =

American microbiologist

Lillian Haldeman Moore (née Lillian Virginia Haldeman); August 8, 1929 – November 21, 2020) was an American microbiologist who was instrumental in founding The Anaerobe Lab at Virginia Tech in 1970. Haldeman and her colleagues led the world in developing techniques to grow and identify anaerobic bacteria in culture. She was an authority in the field of anaerobic bacteriology and food poisoning.

== Early life ==
Lillian Virginia Haldeman—whose name was sometimes misspelled as Holdeman—was born in Moberly, Missouri, in 1929, and nicknamed "Peg". The family moved to Tampa, Florida in 1944, where she graduated valedictorian of Plant High School. She then studied zoology at Duke University, and initially planned on attending medical school. In 1951 she earned her B.S.

She worked at the Centers for Disease Control and Prevention (CDC) for 15 years, where she learned bacteriology and took night classes at the University of Georgia. She later worked at Diagnostic Reagents, producing standard reagents used by state health departments.

Under the name Lillian Haldeman, she earned her Ph.D. from Montana State University in 1962. Her thesis, "Growth and Toxin production of Clostridium botulinum type F", she identified precursors for the intracellular production of the deadly toxin. She married fellow microbiologist and colleague W.E.C. Moore in 1985.

== Career ==
Haldeman joined Virginia Polytechnic Institute in 1966 as a professor of bacteriology. There, she met W.E.C. "Ed" Moore and joined him and Elizabeth Cabo to study intestinal anaerobic bacteria.

After securing a grant from the National Institutes of Health, she served as associate director of the Anaerobic Bacteriology Laboratory, recruiting John Johnson, Louis C. Smith, and C.S. Cummings to the lab group.

In 1971, Haldeman and Moore received grants from NASA and the National Cancer Institute to study the relationship between intestinal bacteria, colon cancer, and cultural diets. An additional study they made had showed that bacterial communities are not exchanged among individuals isolated in space capsules. Their research isolated 150-200 new types of human intestinal bacteria.

In the initial weeks of a Skylab simulation in the early 1970s, Haldeman observed a significant increase in hydrogen-gas-producing Bacteroides thetaiotaomicron (over 26 trillion bacteria) which she linked to stress during the simulation. This increase in B. theta paralleled similar spikes observed in the intestinal population of a diet study volunteer undergoing extreme stress. As a later comparison using graduate students revealed no increase in B. theta, Haldeman concluded that graduate studies did not constitute extreme stress.

Haldeman and Moore co-edited the Anaerobe Manual, in 1972, a laboratory manual that became a standard reference for isolating, culturing and identifying anaerobic bacteria. The latest version was published in 1977 which included additional contributors in the lab. Scientists around the world used their manual as a guide for conducting research on anaerobic bacteria.

In 1974, she and her team conduct research identifying a new genus, Coprococcus, along with the identification of twelve new species of intestinal bacteria.

In 1976, Haldeman was awarded the title of University Distinguished Professor at Virginia Tech for contributions to anaerobic bacteriology research.

Later in her career, she studied bacteria associated with periodontitis, gingivitis and other oral bacteria. In 1984, she published research showing that children are significantly more resistant to gingivitis than adults nd have notably different oral bacterial compositions.

Haldeman and her anaerobe lab team had become known internationally for their research in anaerobic microbiology, helping establish Virginia Tech as a leader in bacteriology and veterinary sciences. Colleague and later lab director Tracy Wilkins remarked, "Peg and her husband were the first to show the importance of the intestinal microbiome and made great strides in elucidating how anaerobic bacteria cause disease.”

She retired in 1996.

In 1997, the bacterium genus Holdemania was named in her honor. Holdemania includes Gram-positive, strictly anaerobic and non-spore-forming bacterium from the family of Erysipelotrichaceae, with two known species: Holdemania filiformis and Holdemania massiliensis.

Haldeman died on November 21, 2020.
