= Holdemania massiliensis =

Scientific classification
- Domain: Bacteria
- Kingdom: Bacillati
- Phylum: Bacillota
- Class: Erysipelotrichia
- Order: Erysipelotrichales
- Family: Erysipelotrichaceae
- Genus: Holdemania
- Species: H. massiliensis

Binomial name
- Holdemania massiliensis Mishra et al. 2016

Type strain
- CSUR P195, DSM 26143, AP2

Synonyms
- "Candidatus Holdemania massiliensis"

Species of bacterium

Holdemania massiliensis is a Gram-positive, anaerobic, non-spore-forming and non-motile bacterium from the genus Holdemania which has been isolated from human feces.

The strain was isolated from a 21 year-old woman suffering from severe restricted anorexia nervosa. The name "massilliensis" is derived from the Roman name of Marseille France where the strain was isolated.
