= Longicatena =

Scientific classification
- Domain: Bacteria
- Kingdom: Bacillati
- Phylum: Bacillota
- Class: Erysipelotrichia
- Order: Erysipelotrichales
- Family: Erysipelotrichaceae
- Genus: Longicatena; Lagkouvardos et al. 2016
- Species: L. caecimuris

Binomial name
- Longicatena caecimuris Lagkouvardos et al. 2016

Genus of bacteria

Longicatena is a genus from the family Erysipelotrichaceae with one known species, Longicatena caecimuris. Longicatena caecimuris has been isolated from the caecal content from a mouse from Freising in Germany.
