= Catenisphaera =

Scientific classification
- Domain: Bacteria
- Kingdom: Bacillati
- Phylum: Bacillota
- Class: Erysipelotrichia
- Order: Erysipelotrichales
- Family: Erysipelotrichaceae
- Genus: Catenisphaera; Kanno et al. 2015
- Species: C. adipataccumulans

Binomial name
- Catenisphaera adipataccumulans Kanno et al. 2015

Genus of bacteria

Catenisphaera is a genus of bacteria from the family Erysipelotrichaceae with one known species, Catenisphaera adipataccumulans. Catenisphaera adipataccumulans has been isolated from an anaerobic digester from Fukagawa in Japan
