= Holdemania =

Scientific classification
- Domain: Bacteria
- Kingdom: Bacillati
- Phylum: Bacillota
- Class: Erysipelotrichia
- Order: Erysipelotrichales
- Family: Erysipelotrichaceae
- Genus: Holdemania; Willems et al. 1997

Type species
- Holdemania filiformis Willems et al. 1997

Species
- Holdemania filiformis; Holdemania massiliensis

Genus of bacteria

Holdemania is a Gram-positive, strictly anaerobic and non-spore-forming genus from the family Erysipelotrichaceae, with two known species: Holdemania filiformis and Holdemania massiliensis.

This genus was named after Lilian V. Holdeman an American microbiologist from the Anaerobe Lab at Virginia Tech.

== Phylogeny ==
The currently accepted taxonomy is based on the List of Prokaryotic names with Standing in Nomenclature (LPSN) and National Center for Biotechnology Information (NCBI).

16S rRNA based LTP_10_2024

- Holdemania
  - H. filiformis Willems et al. 1997
  - H. massiliensis Mishra et al. 2016

120 marker proteins based GTDB 09-RS220

- Holdemania
  - H. filiformis
  - H. massiliensis
