= Erysipelas =

Human disease from a bacterial infection of the skin

- Other names: Ignis sacer, holy fire, St. Anthony's fire
- Erysipelas of the face due to invasive Streptococcus
- Pronunciation: /ɛriˈsɪpələs/
- Specialty: Dermatology, infectious disease

Erysipelas (/ˌɛrəˈsɪpələs/) is a relatively common bacterial infection of the superficial layer of the skin (upper dermis), extending to the superficial lymphatic vessels within the skin, characterized by a raised, well-defined, tender, bright-red rash, typically on the face or legs, but which can occur anywhere on the skin. It is a form of cellulitis and is potentially serious.

Erysipelas is usually caused by the bacterium Streptococcus pyogenes, also known as group A, β-hemolytic streptococci, which enters the body through a break in the skin, such as a scratch or an insect bite. It is more superficial than cellulitis and is typically more raised and demarcated. The term comes from the Greek ἐρυσίπελας (erysípelas), meaning red skin.

In animals, erysipelas is a disease caused by infection with the bacterium Erysipelothrix rhusiopathiae. In animals, it is called diamond skin disease, and occurs especially in pigs. Heart valves and skin are affected. E. rhusiopathiae can also infect humans, but in that case, the infection is known as erysipeloid and is an occupational skin disease.

== Signs and symptoms ==
Symptoms often occur suddenly. Affected individuals may develop a fever, shivering, chills, fatigue, headaches, and vomiting, and be generally unwell within 48 hours of the initial infection. The red plaque enlarges rapidly and has a sharply demarcated, raised edge. It may appear swollen, feel firm, warm, and tender to touch, and have a consistency similar to orange peel. Pain may be extreme.

More severe infections can result in vesicles (pox or insect bite-like marks), blisters, and petechiae (small purple or red spots), with possible skin necrosis (death). Lymph nodes may be swollen and lymphedema may occur. Occasionally, a red streak extending to the lymph node can be seen.

The infection may occur on any part of the skin, including the face, arms, fingers, legs, and toes; it tends to favour the extremities. The umbilical stump and sites of lymphedema are also common sites affected. Fat tissue and facial areas, typically around the eyes, ears, and cheeks, are most susceptible to infection. Repeated infection of the extremities can lead to chronic swelling (lymphoedema).

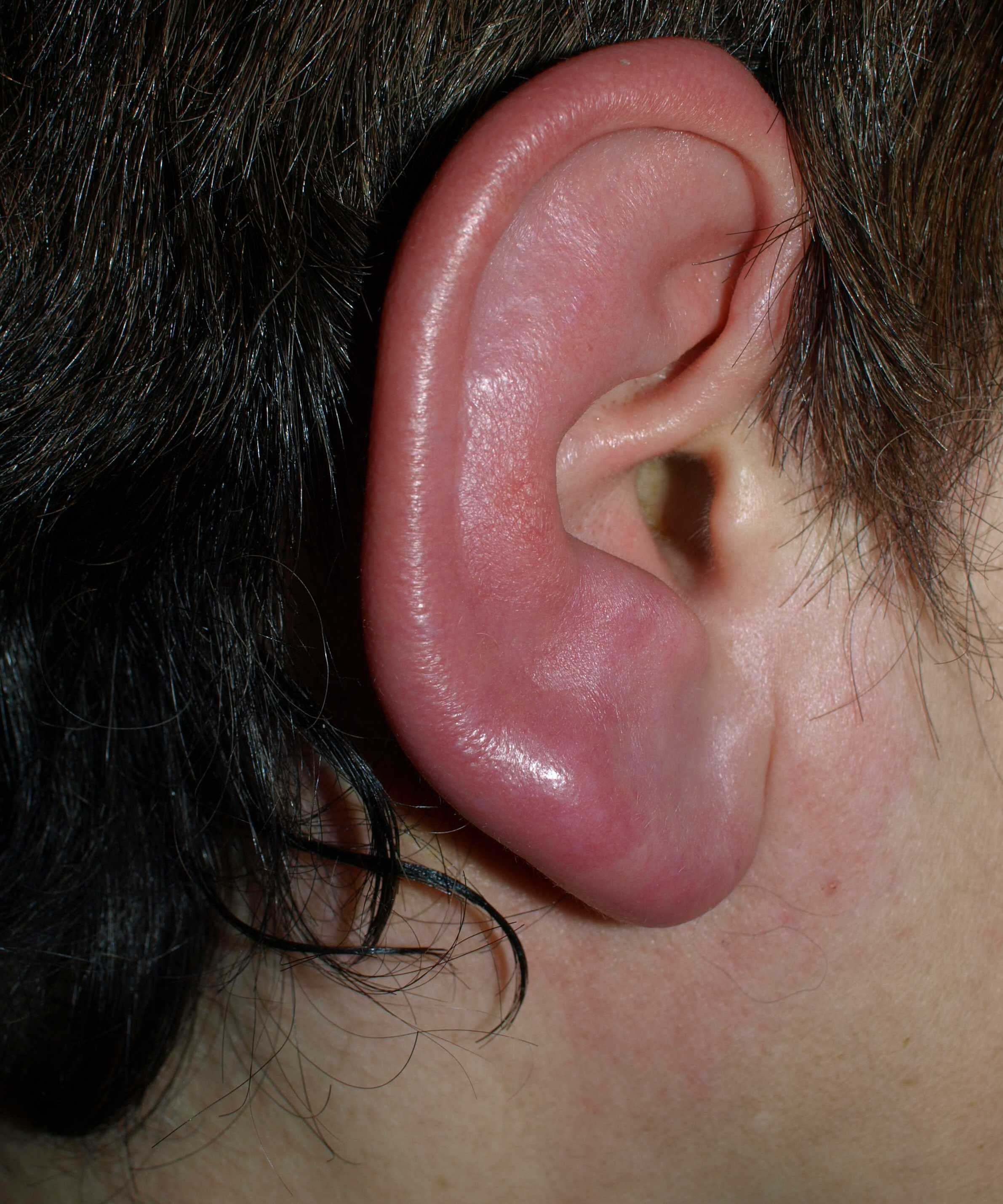
Erysipelas (ear)

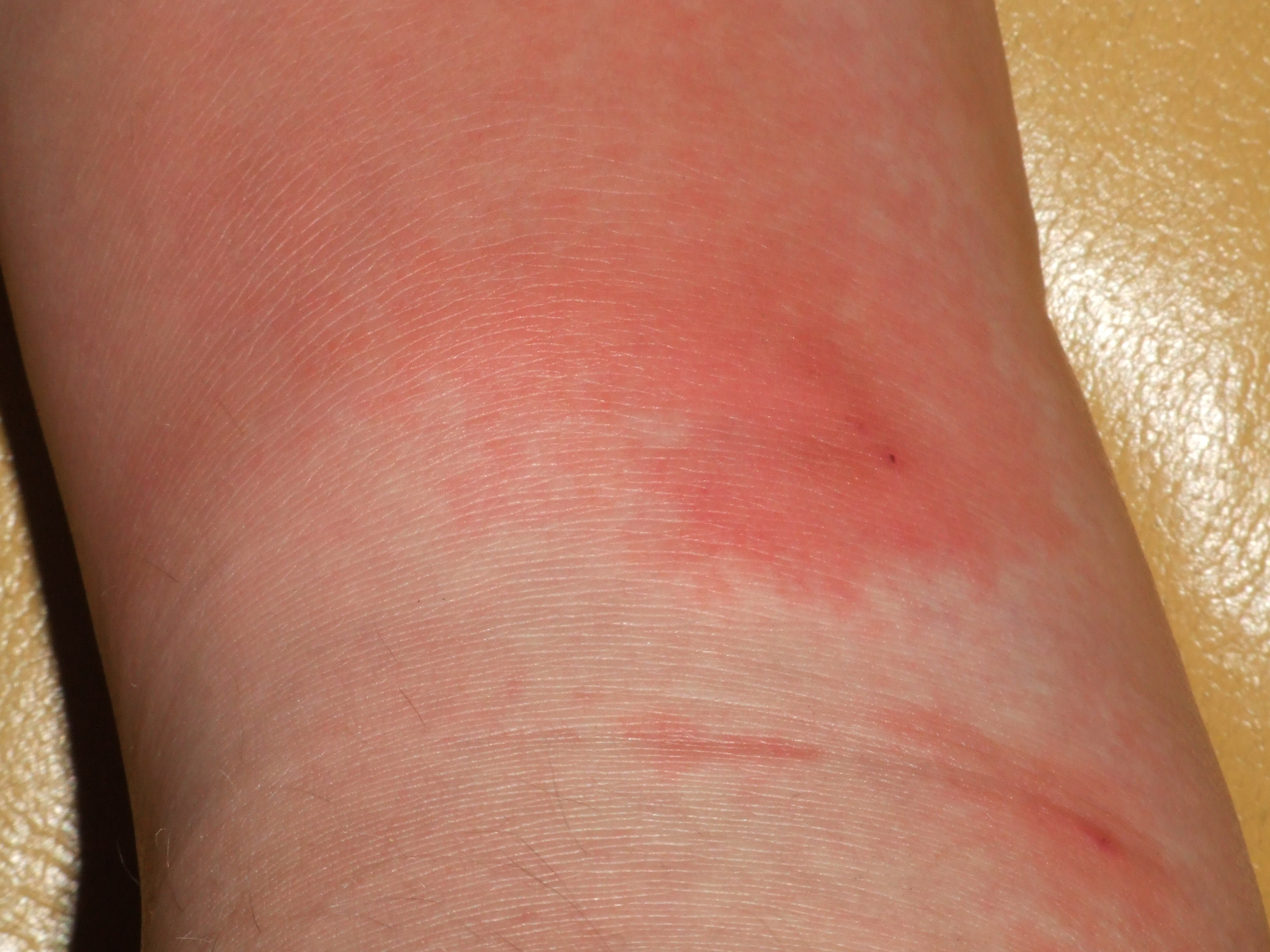
Erysipelas (arm)

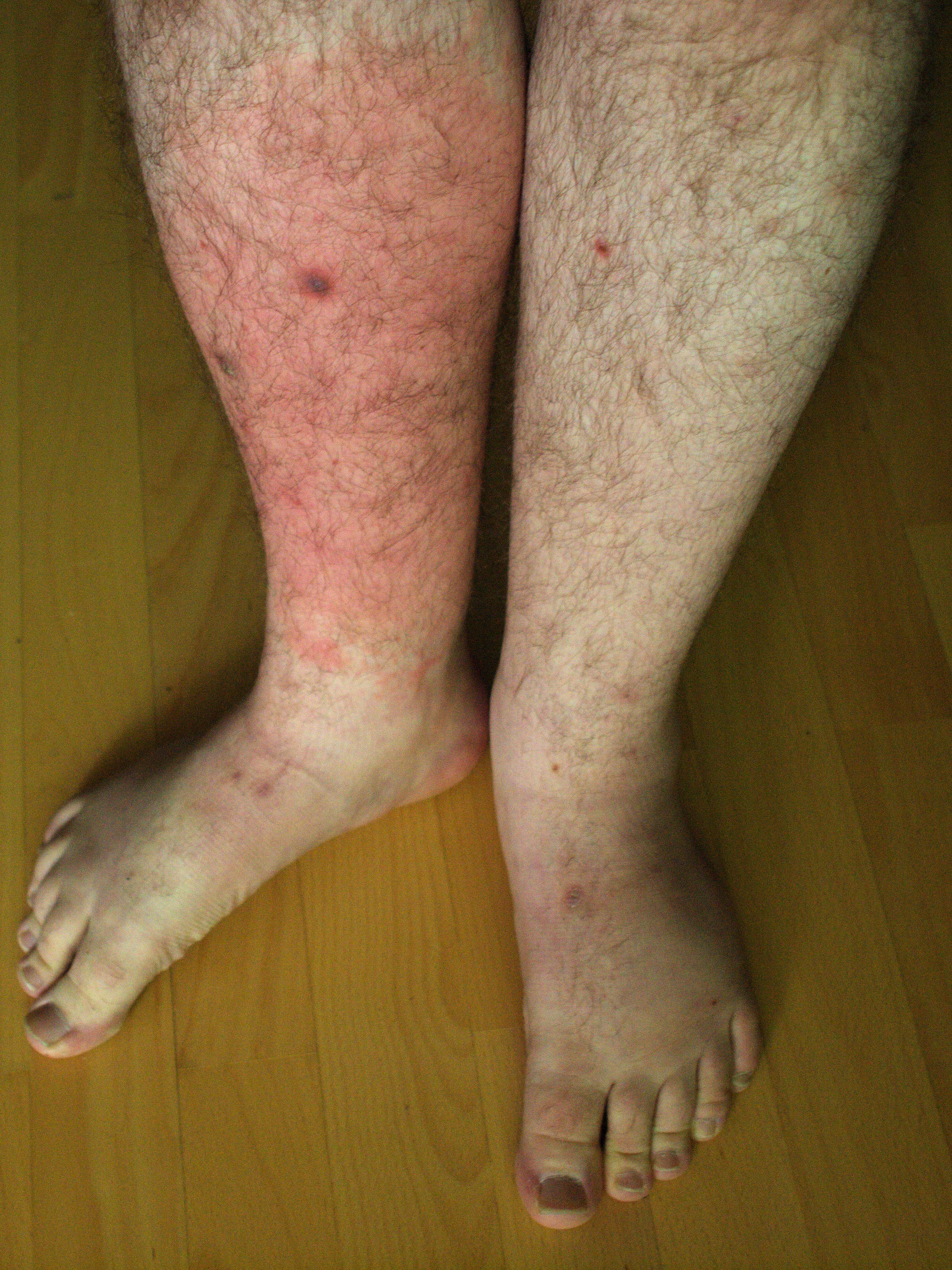
Erysipelas (leg)

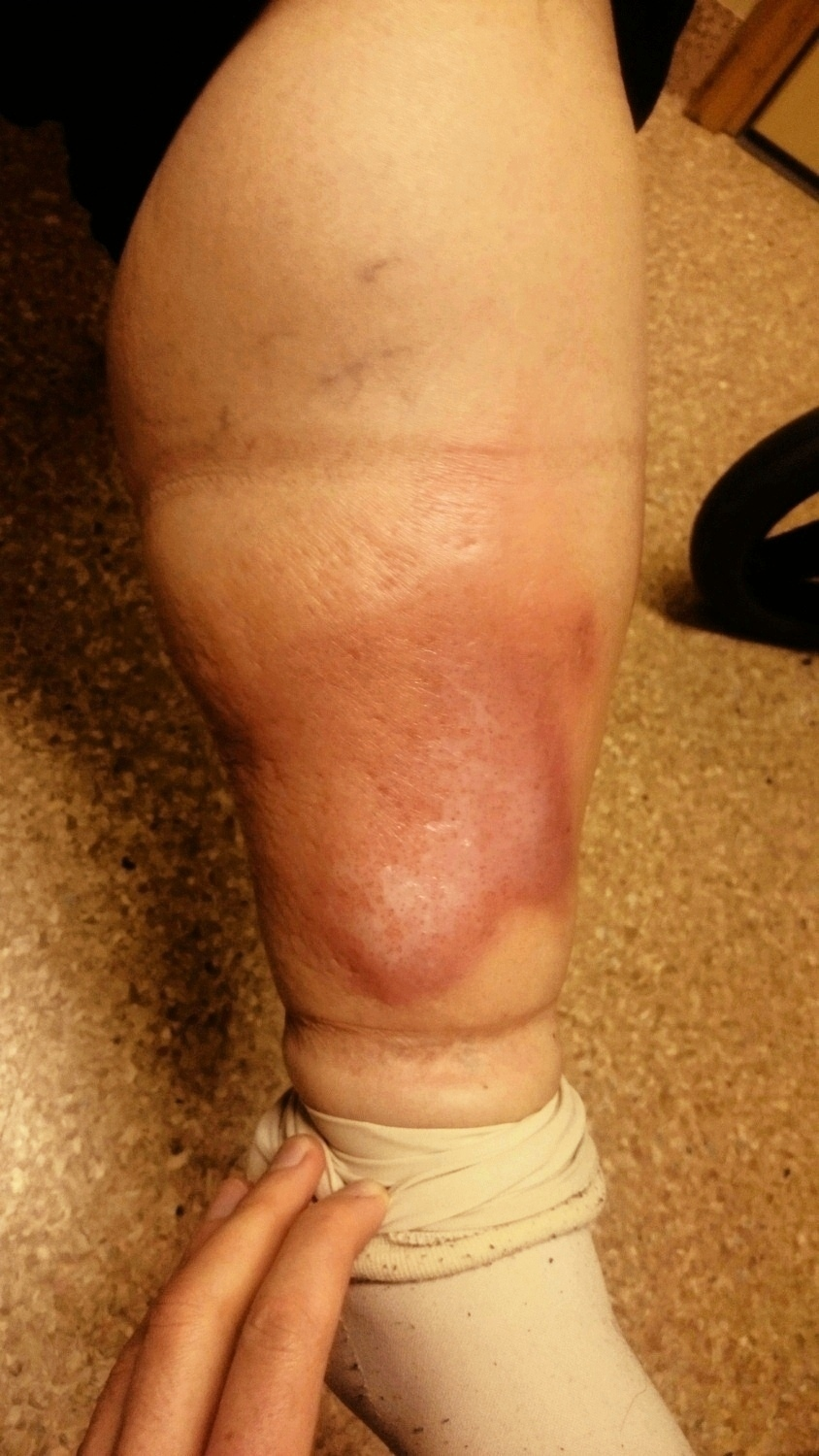
Recurrent erysipelas

== Cause ==
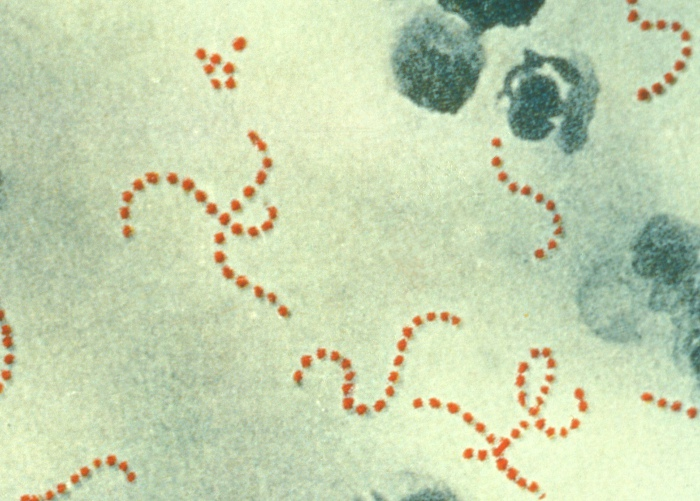
Streptococcus pyogenes

Most cases of erysipelas are due to Streptococcus pyogenes, also known as group A, β-hemolytic streptococci, less commonly to group C or G streptococci and rarely to Staphylococcus aureus. Newborns may contract erysipelas due to Streptococcus agalactiae, also known as group B streptococcus or GBS.

The infecting bacteria can enter the skin through minor trauma, bites (human, insect or animal), surgical incisions, ulcers, burns, or abrasions. Underlying eczema or athlete's foot (tinea pedis) may be present, and it can originate from streptococcal bacteria in the subject's own nasal passages or ear.

The rash is due to an exotoxin, not the Streptococcus bacteria, and is found in areas where no symptoms are present, e.g. the infection may be in the nasopharynx, but the rash is found usually on the epidermis and superficial lymphatics.

== Diagnosis ==
Erysipelas is usually diagnosed by the clinician looking at the characteristic well-demarcated rash following a history of injury or recognition of one of the risk factors. Tests, if performed, may show a high white-cell count, raised CRP, or positive blood culture identifying the organism. Skin cultures are often negative.

Erysipelas must be differentiated from herpes zoster, angioedema, contact dermatitis, erythema chronicum migrans of early Lyme disease, gout, septic arthritis, septic bursitis, vasculitis, allergic reaction to an insect bite, acute drug reaction, deep vein thrombosis, and diffuse inflammatory carcinoma of the breast.

=== Differentiating from cellulitis ===
Erysipelas can be distinguished from cellulitis by two particular features - its raised advancing edge and its sharp borders. The redness in cellulitis is not raised and its border is relatively indistinct. Bright redness of erysipelas has been described as a third differentiating feature.

Erysipelas does not affect subcutaneous tissue. It does not release pus, only serum or serous fluid. Subcutaneous edema may lead the physician to misdiagnose it as cellulitis.

== Treatment ==
Treatment is with antibiotics; (amoxicillin/clavulanic acid, cefalexin, or cloxacillin) taken by mouth for five days, though sometimes longer. Because of the risk of reinfection, prophylactic antibiotics are sometimes used after resolution of the initial condition.

== Prognosis ==
The disease prognosis includes:

- Spread of infection to other areas of body can occur through the bloodstream (bacteremia), including septic arthritis. Glomerulonephritis can follow an episode of streptococcal erysipelas or other skin infection, but not rheumatic fever.
- Recurrence of infection: Erysipelas can recur in 18–30% of cases even after antibiotic treatment. A chronic state of recurrent erysipelas infections can occur with several predisposing factors, including alcoholism, diabetes, and athlete's foot. Another predisposing factor is chronic cutaneous edema, such as can in turn be caused by venous insufficiency or heart failure.
- Lymphatic damage
- Necrotizing fasciitis, commonly known as "flesh-eating" bacterial infection, is a potentially deadly exacerbation of the infection if it spreads to deeper tissue.

== Epidemiology ==
Currently, no validated recent data have been published on the worldwide incidence of erysipelas. From 2004 to 2005, UK hospitals reported 69,576 cases of cellulitis and 516 cases of erysipelas. One book stated that several studies have placed the prevalence rate between one and 250 in every 10,000 people. The development of antibiotics, as well as increased sanitation standards, has contributed to the decreased rate of incidence. Erysipelas caused systemic illness in up to 40% of cases reported by UK hospitals, and 29% of people had recurrent episodes within three years. Anyone can be infected, although incidence rates are higher in infants and elderly. Several studies also reported a higher incidence rate in women. Four out of five cases occur on the legs, although historically, the face was a more frequent site.

Risk factors for developing the disease include:

- Arteriovenous fistula
- Chronic skin conditions such as psoriasis, athlete's foot, and eczema
- Excising the saphenous vein
- Immune deficiency or compromise, such as
  - Diabetes
  - Alcoholism
  - Obesity
  - Human immunodeficiency virus
- In newborns, exposure of the umbilical cord and vaccination site injury
- Issues in lymph or blood circulation
- Leg ulcers
- Lymphatic edema
- Lymphatic obstruction
- Lymphoedema
- Nasopharyngeal infection
- Nephrotic syndrome
- Pregnancy
- Previous episode(s) of erysipelas
- Toe web intertrigo
- Traumatic wounds
- Venous insufficiency or disease

=== Preventive measures ===
Individuals can take preventive steps to decrease their risk of catching the disease. Properly cleaning and covering wounds is important for people with an open wound. Effectively treating athlete's foot or eczema if either was the cause of the initial infection decreases the chance of the infection occurring again. People with diabetes should pay attention to maintaining good foot hygiene. Follow up with doctors is important to make sure the disease has not come back or spread. About one-third of people who have had erysipelas will be infected again within three years. Rigorous antibiotics may be needed in the case of recurrent bacterial skin infections.

== Notable cases ==
Fatal, in order of death
- Archibald Douglas, 6th Earl of Angus, (d. 1557), Scottish nobleman active in the reigns of James V and Mary, Queen of Scots
- John of the Cross, Spanish saint and priest (d. 1591)
- Elisabeth of France, Queen of Spain (d. 1644)
- Marin Mersenne, French theologian, philosopher, and mathematician (d. 1648): In one of his letters, R. Descartes writes to Mersenne that he wants to find some cure for his erysipelas.
- Margaret Throckmorton (d. 1668), prioress
- Michiel de Ruyter, Dutch admiral in the Anglo-Dutch wars, contracted it from injuries sustained from a cannonball (d. 1676).
- Christina, Queen of Sweden (d. 1689)
- Norborne Berkeley, baron de Botetourt, Royal Governor of Virginia (d. 1770)
- Princess Amelia of the United Kingdom, daughter of George III of the United Kingdom (1783–1810)
- Grand Duchess Catherine Pavlovna of Russia, daughter of Tsar Paul I of Russia and wife of King William I of Württemberg (d. 1819)
- Sir George Beaumont, 7th Baronet, British art patron and amateur painter (d. 1827)
- William Wirt, United States Attorney General and U.S. presidential candidate (d. 1834)
- Charles Lamb, English writer and essayist (d. 1834)
- Prince Augustus Frederick, Duke of Sussex sixth son and ninth child of King George III (d. 1843)
- Barbara Hofland, English children's writer and novelist (d. 1844)
- Pope Gregory XVI (d. 1846)
- Mary Lyon, American women's education pioneer (d. 1849)
- Marie, Dowager Duchess of Saxe-Coburg-Gotha (d. 1860)
- John Herbert White, youngest son of James S. and Ellen G. White, co-founders of the Seventh-day Adventist church (d. 1860)
- Ralph Bullock, English jockey (d. 1863)
- Frederick VII of Denmark, king of Denmark (d. 1863)
- John Timon, First Roman Catholic Bishop of Buffalo, New York, United States (d. 1867)
- Charles J. Helm, American politician and diplomat (d. 1868)
- Nehemiah Bushnell, American attorney, railroad president, and politician (d. 1873)
- John Stuart Mill, English political philosopher (d. 1873)
- Marcus Clarke (1846–1881), Australian journalist, poet, playwright and novelist, who wrote "For the Term of His Natural Life", died age 35.
- John Brown, Scottish personal servant and companion to Queen Victoria (d. 1883)
- Mihai Eminescu, Romanian poet, novelist, journalist (d. 1889)
- Pat Killen, American heavyweight boxer, died at age 29 while in hiding in Chicago from police after assaulting two men (d. 1891).
- Samuel Augustus Ward, American organist, composer, teacher, businessman (d. 1903)
- Johann Most, German-American anarchist politician, newspaper editor, and orator (d. 1906)
- James Anthony Bailey, American circus ringmaster (d. 1906)
- Yūjirō Motora, prominent Japanese experimental psychologist (d. 1912)
- George Herbert, 5th Earl of Carnarvon (d. 1923), English aristocrat and financial backer of the search for and excavation of Tutankhamun's tomb in the Valley of the Kings
- Miller Huggins, American baseball player and manager (d. 1929)
- Father Solanus Casey, American Capuchin priest declared "blessed" by the Roman Catholic Church (d. 1957)

Chronic, recurrent

- Richard Wagner, opera composer, was prone to outbreaks of erysipelas throughout his adult life. He suffered notably from attacks throughout 1855, when he was 42.

Acute

- Jair Bolsonaro, president of Brazil between 2019 and 2022, currently suffers from erysipelas.

Recovered

- John Wilkes Booth, President Abraham Lincoln's assassin, August 1864.
- Lenin developed an infection in London, and party leadership was exercised by Martov until he recovered.
- Ernest Hemingway developed an infection near his left eye after being hit with an oar. He was treated at the Casa di Cura Morgagni in Padua.

Fictional

- In D. H. Lawrence's novel Sons and Lovers, one of the major characters in the novel, William Morel, dies quickly from the complications of erysipelas in conjunction with pneumonia.
- In Arthur Conan Doyle's 1924 short story, "The Adventure of the Illustrious Client", Sherlock Holmes is reported to have developed erysipelas following an assault that resulted in head injuries requiring stitches.
- In Anton Chekhov's 1892 short story "Ward No. 6", erysipelas is among the conditions suffered by the patients committed to a poorly run mental-illness facility in a small town in tsarist Russia.
- In J. G. Farrell's novel The Siege of Krishnapur, the Collector, Mr. Hopkins, is affected during the siege and recovers.
- Mark Twain's Roughing It mentions the disease due to the rarefied atmosphere (chapter 43).
- In Dashiell Hammett's The Thin Man, the name is used for a pun on the word "ear" (chapter 22).
- In Willa Cather's One of Ours, the main character, Claude, contracts the disease in "the queerest" way, after being dragged into wire by mules, and the next day continuing to work in the dust. The disease plays a key role in the novel, persuading him to marry Enid after she cares for him in recovery (Book II, Chapter IV, p. 138).
- In series one, episode four of Downton Abbey, Isobel Crawley misdiagnoses her butler, Molesley, with erysipelas when he develops a rash on his hands. The Dowager Countess of Grantham correctly identifies the rash as an allergy to rue.
- In Rodrigo Souza Leão's autobiographical novel All Dogs are Blue, he says that his erysipelas is cured by the antibiotic Benzetacil (benzathine benzylpenicillin).

== History ==
It was historically known as St Anthony's fire, with past treatments including muriated tincture of iron, a solution of Iron(III) chloride in alcohol.
