= Bulleidia extructa =

Scientific classification
- Domain: Bacteria
- Kingdom: Bacillati
- Phylum: Bacillota
- Class: Erysipelotrichia
- Order: Erysipelotrichales
- Family: Erysipelotrichaceae
- Genus: Bulleidia
- Species: B. extructa

Binomial name
- Bulleidia extructa Downes et al. 2000

Type strain
- ATCC BAA-170, DSM 13220, W 1219

Species of bacterium

Bulleidia extructa is a Gram-positive, anaerobic and non-spore-forming bacterium from the genus Bulleidia.
