= Rodrigo Leão =

Rodrigo Leão may refer to:

- Rodrigo Leão (musician) (born 1964), Portuguese musician
- Rodrigo Leão (volleyball) (born 1996), Brazilian volleyball player
- Rodrigo Souza Leão (1965–2009), Brazilian journalist
