= Faecalibaculum =

Scientific classification
- Domain: Bacteria
- Kingdom: Bacillati
- Phylum: Bacillota
- Class: Erysipelotrichia
- Order: Erysipelotrichales
- Family: Erysipelotrichaceae
- Genus: Faecalibaculum; Chang et al. 2016
- Species: F. rodentium

Binomial name
- Faecalibaculum rodentium Chang et al. 2016

Genus of bacteria

Faecalibaculum is a Gram-positive, strictly anaerobic, non-spore-forming and non-motile genus of bacteria from the family Erysipelotrichaceae with one known species, Faecalibaculum rodentium. Faecalibaculum rodentium has been isolated from the faeces of a laboratory mouse from Korea.
