= Breznakia =

Scientific classification
- Domain: Bacteria
- Kingdom: Bacillati
- Phylum: Bacillota
- Class: Erysipelotrichia
- Order: Erysipelotrichales
- Family: Erysipelotrichaceae
- Genus: Breznakia; Tegtmeier et al. 2016

Type species
- Breznakia blatticola Tegtmeier et al. 2016

Species
- Breznakia blatticola; Breznakia pachnodae

Genus of bacteria

Breznakia is a genus of gram-positive bacteria from the family Erysipelotrichaceae.
