= Ileibacterium =

Scientific classification
- Domain: Bacteria
- Kingdom: Bacillati
- Phylum: Bacillota
- Class: Erysipelotrichia
- Order: Erysipelotrichales
- Family: Erysipelotrichaceae
- Genus: Ileibacterium; Cox et al. 2017 non Mailhe et al. 2017

Type species
- Ileibacterium valens Cox et al. 2017

Species
- Ileibacterium valens

Genus of bacteria

Ileibacterium is a genus from the family Erysipelotrichaceae.
