= Patrick Killen =

American boxer

Pat Killen
Personal information
- Nickname: The Cyclone of the Northwest
- Nationality: American
- Born: Patrick J. Killen; December 24, 1859 Haddington, Pennsylvania
- Died: October 21, 1891 (age 29)
- Weight: Heavyweight

Boxing career
- Stance: Orthodox

Boxing record
- Total fights: 60
- Wins: 54
- Win by KO: 52
- Losses: 2
- Draws: 3
- No contests: 1

Pat Killen (December 24, 1861 – October 21, 1891) was an American boxer. He died at 29, in Chicago while hiding from Minnesota authorities.

== Early life ==
Killen was born in Haddington, Pennsylvania. He later moved to Minnesota, where he made his home for the majority of his life and career (notwithstanding the final five months of his life).

== Boxing career ==
Standing 6 ft 1 in (1.85 m) and weighing around 195 pounds (88 kg), he was large for a heavyweight of his era. This benefited him tremendously, as he was nearly 3 in (7.6 cm) taller than most of his opponents. He was a patient fighter who usually waited for his opponent to make the first move, while setting up his punch. He was known as the best counter-punching heavyweight of his era, but known even more for his devastating one-punch power, winning most often by knockout. Some at the time felt he may have had greater one-punch power than even boxers John L. Sullivan or Peter Maher, but he was less tough or durable, and not as aggressive or tenacious as Sullivan, the reigning champion at that time.

Killen's first fight was against John Howard, whom he managed to knock out in the second round. Twenty-one more wins followed (all by knockout) before he lost on a foul against Mervine Thompson. Killen had knocked down the highly regarded Thompson four times, but the referee allegedly kept giving Thompson all the time he needed to recover each time, prompting the crowd to grow angry and storm the ring, as well as Killen taking off his gloves in disgust. All of this caused him to lose by disqualification.

== Death ==
Contrary to historical reports, Killen was not murdered; he died of erysipelas in Chicago, while on the run from the authorities from his home state of Minnesota, where he had been arrested for assault and battery of two different people, both within two days, and both during drunken stupors. He made bail and fled the state to Winnipeg and then later Chicago. He was 29 when he died.

== Legacy ==
He was rated as the seventh all-time greatest Minnesota heavyweight by boxing historian George Blair. His current (incomplete) record is 55 wins (52 by knockout), two losses, three draws and one no-contest.

== Professional boxing record ==
60 fights	54 wins	2 losses
By knockout	51	1
By decision	2	0
By disqualification	1	1
Draws	3	
No contests	1	

No.	Result	Record	Opponent	Type	Round	Date	Location	Notes
60	Win	54–2–3 (1)	Bob Ferguson	KO	6 (?)	Oct 11, 1891	Picnic Grove, Richardson, Illinois, US	Retained Northwestern heavyweight title
59	Win	53–2–3 (1)	Joe Sheehy	DQ	2 (15)	Dec 19, 1890	Jackson Street Rink, Saint Paul, Minnesota, US	Retained Northwestern heavyweight title; Sheehy was DQ'd for throwing Killen to ground four times, stomping on him, and biting him in the chest, the leg, and the stomach.
58	Loss	52–2–3 (1)	Joe McAuliffe	KO	7 (?)	Sep 11, 1889	Golden State A.C., San Francisco, California, US	Killen reportedly entered the fight drunk and missed so wildly on his punches, that he fell and dislocated his right shoulder in the second round
57	Win	52–1–3 (1)	Jack Welch	KO	3 (?)	Aug 14, 1889	Astoria, Oregon, US	
56	Win	51–1–3 (1)	Jack Fraser	KO	3 (?)	Jul 22, 1889	Spokane Falls, Washington, US	
55	Win	50–1–3 (1)	Jack Smith	KO	2 (?)	Jul 16, 1889	Tacoma, Washington, US	Exact date unknown
54	Win	49–1–3 (1)	Corporal Toomey	KO	1 (?)	Jul 11, 1889	Miles City, Montana, US	
53	Win	48–1–3 (1)	Patsy Cardiff	KO	4 (15)	Jun 26, 1888	Washington Roller Rink, Minneapolis, Minnesota, US	Won Northwestern heavyweight title
52	Win	47–1–3 (1)	Jack Cooper	KO	1 (?)	Jan 1, 1888	Theatre Comique, Minneapolis	Exact date unknown
51	Win	46–1–3 (1)	Lem McGregor	PTS	6	Dec 16, 1887	Cominique Theater, Minneapolis	
50	Win	45–1–3 (1)	Frank Cook	KO	2 (?)	Nov 25, 1887	Duluth, Minnesota, US	
49	Win	44–1–3 (1)	O.H. Smith	KO	2 (?)	Nov 17, 1887	Rochester, New York, US	
48	Win	43–1–3 (1)	Frank Lewis	KO	1 (?)	Oct 12, 1887	Philadelphia, Pennsylvania, US	
47	Win	42–1–3 (1)	Henry Dows	KO	1 (?)	Sep 7, 1887	Covington, Kentucky, US	
46	Win	41–1–3 (1)	James Smith	KO	1 (?)	Sep 5, 1887	Covington	
45	Draw	40–1–3 (1)	Patsy Cardiff	PTS	10	Aug 5, 1887	Duluth Theatre, Duluth	For Northwest heavyweight title
44	Win	40–1–2 (1)	O.H. Smith	KO	1 (?)	May 2, 1887	Duluth Theatre, Duluth	
43	Win	39–1–2 (1)	Jack Cook	KO	1 (?)	Apr 1, 1887	Duluth	
42	Win	38–1–2 (1)	Duncan McDonald	KO	1 (10), 2:46	Mar 4, 1887	Washington Roller Rink, Minneapolis	
41	Win	37–1–2 (1)	Paddy McDonald	KO	7 (10)	Jan 17, 1887	Duluth	
40	Win	36–1–2 (1)	O.H. Smith	KO	2 (5)	Jan 4, 1887	Jackson Theater, Duluth	
39	Win	35–1–2 (1)	Ed McKeown	KO	5 (?)	Dec 28, 1886	Location unknown	
38	Draw	34–1–2 (1)	Bill Bradburn	PTS	5	Dec 23, 1886	Exposition Rink, Saint Paul, Minnesota	Bradburn refused to fight, because the money was insufficient, and had only agreed to spar five rounds with large gloves.
37	Win	34–1–1 (1)	John Cusick	PTS	6	Nov 12, 1886	Theatre Comique, Minneapolis	
36	Win	33–1–1 (1)	Tug Wilson	KO	4 (?)	Oct 24, 1886	Duluth	Exact date unknown
35	Win	32–1–1 (1)	Luke Dempsey	KO	1 (4)	Oct 16, 1886	Exposition Rink, Saint Paul	
34	Win	31–1–1 (1)	Mike Haley	KO	4 (?)	Sep 15, 1886	Omaha, Nebraska, US	
33	Win	30–1–1 (1)	Dan Stalker	KO	2 (?)	Aug 15, 1886	Eau Claire, Wisconsin, US	
32	Draw	29–1–1 (1)	Paddy McDonald	PTS	4	Aug 7, 1886	Duluth	Prearranged draw in case of a decision
31	Win	29–1 (1)	Jim Brady	KO	1 (?)	Aug 2, 1886	Milwaukee, Wisconsin, US	
30	Win	28–1 (1)	Tom Donnelly	KO	2 (?)	Jul 2, 1886	Saint Paul	
29	Win	27–1 (1)	Captain Jim Daly	KO	3 (6)	Jul 2, 1886	Theatre Comique, Minneapolis	
28	Win	26–1 (1)	Dan Stalker	KO	2 (5)	Jun 19, 1886	Olympic Theater, Saint Paul	
27	Win	25–1 (1)	John Morris	KO	2 (?)	Jun 7, 1886	Minneapolis	
26	Win	24–1 (1)	Captain James Dalton	KO	3 (?)	Jun 1, 1886	Minneapolis	
25	Win	23–1 (1)	Patsy Mellen	KO	2 (?)	May 2, 1886	Theatre Comique, Minneapolis	
24	Loss	22–1 (1)	Mervine Thompson	DQ	4 (?)	Apr 20, 1886	Cleveland Crib Club, Cleveland, Ohio, US	After scoring four knockdowns, Killen was inexplicably DQ'd when the fans rushed into the ring.
23	Win	22–0 (1)	Bill Jordan	KO	3 (?)	Apr 8, 1886	Vine Street Opera House, Cincinnati, Ohio, US	
22	Win	21–0 (1)	Mike Smith	KO	1 (?)	Apr 7, 1886	Vine Street Opera House, Cincinnati	
21	Win	20–0 (1)	John Hughes	KO	3 (?)	Apr 6, 1886	Cincinnati	
20	Win	19–0 (1)	Mike Haley	KO	2 (?)	Apr 5, 1886	People's Theater, Omaha	
19	Win	18–0 (1)	Dan Stalker	KO	1 (?), 0:21	Apr 2, 1886	Criterion Rink, Eau Claire	
18	Win	17–0 (1)	Jim Brady	KO	1 (5), 2:40	Mar 28, 1886	South Side Palace Rink, Milwaukee	
17	Win	16–0 (1)	John Hughes	TKO	1 (4)	Mar 18, 1886	Vine Street Opera House, Cincinnati	
16	NC	15–0 (1)	Pat McHugh	NC	6 (?)	Mar 6, 1886	Park Theatre, Chicago, Illinois, US	Fight stopped for dirty tactics by both fighters
15	Win	15–0	George Gray	KO	2 (?)	Feb 26, 1886	Louisville, Kentucky, US	
14	Win	14–0	Martin McComiskey	KO	4 (?)	Feb 15, 1886	Covington	
13	Win	13–0	Dick Burke	KO	1 (?)	Feb 5, 1886	Park Theatre, Chicago	
12	Win	12–0	Pat McHugh	KO	4 (?)	Jan 6, 1886	Chicago	
11	Win	11–0	George Gray	KO	3 (5)	Dec 21, 1885	Liederkrauz Hall, Louisville	
10	Win	10–0	Joe Lannon	KO	9	Nov 8, 1885	Silk's Grove, Saint Paul	A finish fight
9	Win	9–0	Jack Morris	KO	2 (?)	Sep 3, 1885	Park Theatre, Chicago	
8	Win	8–0	John Lynch	KO	3 (?)	Aug 2, 1885	Philadelphia, Pennsylvania, US	
7	Win	7–0	Dan Ring	KO	1 (?)	Aug 1, 1885	Binghamton, New York, US	Exact date uncertain
6	Win	6–0	Denny Kelliher	KO	4 (?)	May 3, 1885	Philadelphia	
5	Win	5–0	Mike Devine	KO	1 (?)	Nov 2, 1884	Comique Theatre, Philadelphia	
4	Win	4–0	Tom Boylan	KO	5 (?)	Apr 2, 1884	Location unknown	
3	Win	3–0	Lew Creamer	KO	2 (?)	Nov 1, 1883	Location unknown	Exact date uncertain
2	Win	2–0	Hial Stoddard	KO	1 (?)	Sep 8, 1883	Club Theater, Philadelphia	
1	Win	1–0	John Howard	KO	2 (?)	Jul 6, 1883	Philadelphia	
