= Anaerobutyricum hallii =

Scientific classification
- Domain: Bacteria
- Kingdom: Bacillati
- Phylum: Bacillota
- Class: Clostridia
- Order: Lachnospirales
- Family: Lachnospiraceae
- Genus: Anaerobutyricum
- Species: A. hallii

Binomial name
- Anaerobutyricum hallii Shetty et al. 2018

Synonyms
- Eubacterium hallii

Species of bacteria

Anaerobutyricum hallii (formerly Eubacterium hallii) is an anaerobic bacterium that lives inside the human digestive system.
