= Clostridium innocuum =

Scientific classification
- Domain: Bacteria
- Kingdom: Bacillati
- Phylum: Bacillota
- Class: Clostridia
- Order: Eubacteriales
- Family: Clostridiaceae
- Genus: Clostridium
- Species: C. innocuum

Binomial name
- Clostridium innocuum Smith and King 1962

Species of bacterium

Clostridium innocuum is an anaerobic, non-motile, gram-positive bacterium that reproduces by sporulation. While there are over 130 species of Clostridium, C. innocuum is the third most commonly isolated. Although it is not normally considered an aggressive human pathogen, it has been isolated in some disease processes. C. innocuum and other Clostridium line the oropharynx and gastrointestinal tract, and are considered normal gut flora.

== Characteristics and identification ==
Anaerobic gram-positive bacilli affecting human beings are generally divided into two distinct groups, those that form spores (Clostridium spp.) and those that do not form spores. Within the spore-forming group of Clostridium species, some are very pathogenic or toxigenic (C. perfringens) while others are rarely pathogenic. Identification and differentiation between anaerobic gram-positive bacteria in a clinical laboratory can be a very difficult task. When the class Clostridia was separated into Clostridia and Erysipelotrichia, Clostridium innocuum was reassigned as Erysipelotrichia Erysipelotrichales Erysipelotrichaceae Erysipelotrichaceae incertae sedis, but is still commonly referred to as Clostridium innocuum.

Clostridium innocuum forms white, glossy, raised colonies and exhibits a chartreuse fluorescence. It is a small, non-flagellated rod that does not swarm. However, human intestinal isolates can often exhibit twitching motility. C. innocuum falls into the saccharolytic, non-proteolytic group of Clostridium spp. and is negative for gelatin hydrolysis, lecithinase, lipase, indole, urea, and nitrate. It is positive for glucose fermentation, esculin and produces oval, terminal spores.

== Pathology ==
Although Clostridium innocuum are often present and harmless in healthy people, they have been isolated in various infections and predominantly in patients that are immunocompromised as an opportunistic bacteria. In one case, C. innocuum was isolated in an infected hematoma adjacent to a transplanted kidney in a 38-year-old hepatitis C patient. Originally, the bacteria was misidentified as another Clostridium species but was eventually correctly identified. This led the authors to state that C. innocuum infection post transplant may be severely underestimated. C. innocuum has also been implicated in cases of fatal bacteremia as reported in a retrospective study done by Newark Beth Israel Medical Center. Patients that succumbed to the infection (100% mortality) had underlying disease states (malignancy, diabetes or liver disease). While clostridial species only account for 2% of clinical bacteremia, C innocuum was among the three most commonly isolated bacteria in this study. C. innocuum has also been isolated in patients with recurrent diarrhea who had prior C. difficile associated diarrhea. One case of fatal bacterial endocarditis was also found in the literature. This is possibly the only confirmed case of C. innocuum endocarditis involving the pulmonary and tricuspid valves resulting in multiple emboli and death. C. innocuum is also commonly the signature bacterial species found in creeping fat from Crohn's disease patients.

== Drug resistance ==
In a study that identified clostridial species using commercial identification kits, it was found that as many as 10% of C. innocuum isolates were somewhat resistant to clindamycin. Most strains were found to be only moderately susceptible to vancomycin (MIC at which 90% of strains are inhibited, 4 micrograms/mL). In another study, where C innocuum was positively identified by gas-liquid chromatography, resistance to vancomycin was seen in all 28 strains isolated. All other clostridial species were at least 8 times more susceptible to vancomycin than C. innocuum, suggesting an intrinsic vancomycin resistance mechanism in C. innocuum.
