= Erysipeloid =

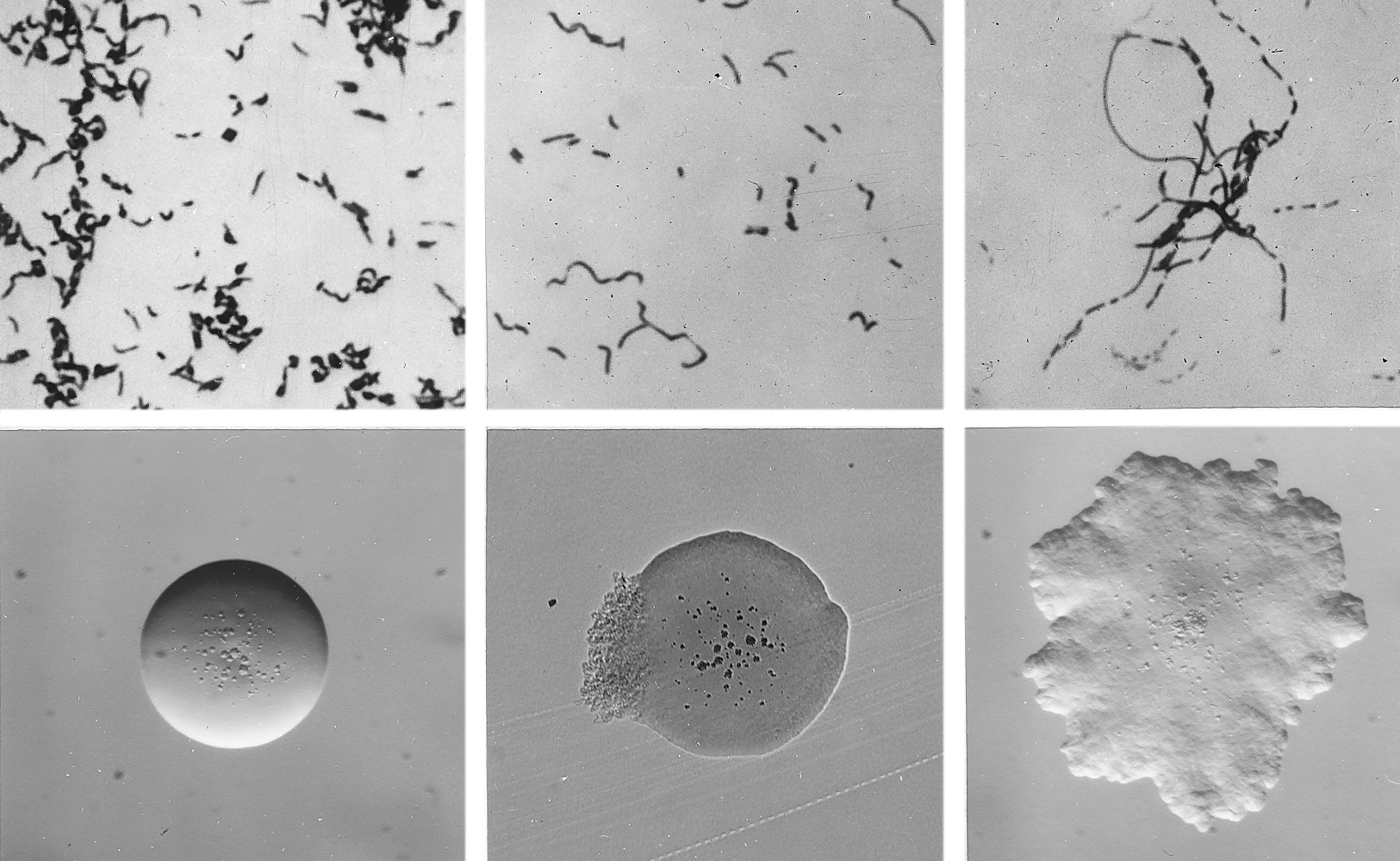
- Cellular and colonial morphology of Erysipelothrix rhusiopathiae
- Specialty: Infectious diseases
- Diagnostic method: gram staining or blood Agar culture

In humans, Erysipelothrix rhusiopathiae infections most commonly present in a mild cutaneous form known as erysipeloid or fish poisoning. E. rhusiopathiae can cause an indolent cellulitis, more commonly in individuals who handle fish and raw meat. Erysipelothrix rhusiopathiae also causes Swine Erysipelas. It is common in domestic pigs and can be transmitted to humans who work with swine. It gains entry typically by abrasions in the hand. Bacteremia and endocarditis are uncommon but serious sequelae. Due to the rarity of reported human cases, E. rhusiopathiae infections are frequently misidentified at presentation.

== Diagnosis ==
Violaceous swelling with severe pain but without pus (Which differentiates from pus forming streptococcal and staphylococcal erysipelas)

== Erysipeloid of Rosenbach ==
Erysipeloid of Rosenbach is a cutaneous condition most frequently characterized by a purplish marginated swelling on the hands. The eponym Rosenbach's disease is in reference to the milder type of the condition and is named after Friedrich Julius Rosenbach. Early work on the condition in US fishermen was carried out by Klaunders and colleagues.

== Treatment ==
The treatment of choice is a single dose of benzathine benzylpenicillin given by intramuscular injection, or a five-day to one-week course of either oral penicillin or intramuscular procaine benzylpenicillin. Erythromycin or doxycycline may be given instead to people who are allergic to penicillin. E. rhusiopathiae is intrinsically resistant to vancomycin.
