= W. E. C. Moore =

American microbiologist (1927–1996)

Walter Edward Cladek Moore (October 12, 1927 – 25 September 1996) was an American microbiologist who was instrumental in founding The Anaerobe Lab at Virginia Tech. The Anaerobe Lab was built in 1970 and was a world leader in developing techniques to grow anaerobic bacteria in culture. With other faculty members he co-wrote the Anaerobe Manual.

He married colleague Lillian "Peg" Haldeman in 1985. They were married until his death. She died in 2020 and was survived by three stepsons (Howard Moore, Jed Moore, and David Moore).
