= Rodrigo Souza Leão =

Brazilian journalist, musician, poet, writer and painter (1965–2009)

Rodrigo de Souza Leão
- Born: Rodrigo Antonio de Souza Leão; 4 November 1965; Rio de Janeiro, Brazil
- Died: 2 July 2009 (aged 43); Rio de Janeiro, Brazil
- Occupations: Journalist, musician, poet, author, painter
- Notable work: All Dogs are Blue

Rodrigo Antonio de Souza Leão (4 November 1965 – 2 July 2009) was a Brazilian journalist, musician, poet, writer and painter.

Rodrigo de Souza Leão was born in Rio de Janeiro in 1965 and died in a psychiatric clinic in Rio in 2009, shortly after his extraordinary autobiographical novel All Dogs are Blue was published. Due to his mental fragility, Rodrigo de Souza Leão rarely left his house and yet he used social media, blogging and email a lot, becoming close friends with a large number of Brazilian writers and poets who hold him in high regard today. His death was marked by a flood of poems in homage.

During his lifetime, Souza Leão was a prolific writer, publishing many books of poetry and co-founding and co-editing one of Brazil's most important poetry magazines, Zunái. Since his death, further works of fiction have been published to widespread acclaim. All Dogs are Blue has been adapted for the stage and his outsider art has been presented in an individual exhibition at Rio's Museum of Modern Art, entitled 'Everything Will be the Colour You Want it to Be'.

"All Dogs are Blue", has been translated into English by Zoë Perry and Stefan Tobler and was published by And Other Stories in 2013.

== Bibliography ==
- "All Dogs are Blue" trans. Zoë Perry and Stefan Tobler. London: And Other Stories, 2013. ISBN 9781908276209.
