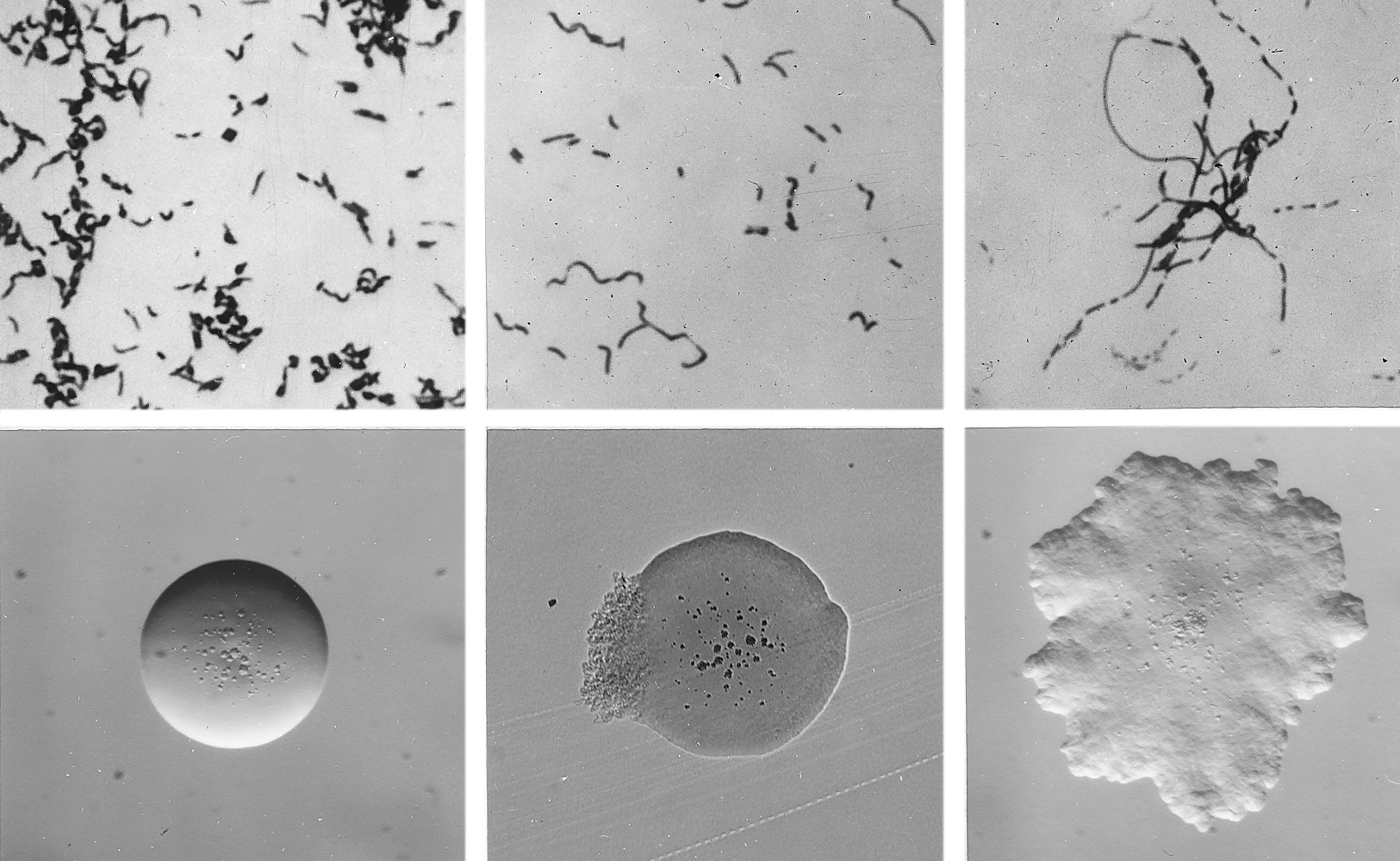
- Cellular and colonial morphology of Erysipelothrix rhusiopathiae

Scientific classification
- Domain: Bacteria
- Kingdom: Bacillati
- Phylum: Bacillota
- Class: Erysipelotrichia
- Order: Erysipelotrichales
- Family: Erysipelotrichaceae; Verbarg et al. 2004

Genera
- See text

= Erysipelotrichaceae =

Family of bacteria

Erysipelotrichaceae is a family of Gram-positive bacteria.

== Phylogeny ==
The currently accepted taxonomy is based on the List of Prokaryotic names with Standing in Nomenclature (LPSN) and National Center for Biotechnology Information (NCBI).

16S rRNA based LTP_10_2024

- Erysipelotrichaceae
  - - - Holdemania
      - - Anaerorhabdus
        - - Stecheria Wylensek et al. 2021
          - - Bulleidia
            - Solobacterium Kageyama and Benno 2000
    - Erysipelothrix
  - - Dielma
    - - Breznakia
      - - Copranaerobaculum
        - - - Absiella Paek et al. 2020
            - - Amedibacillus [incl. Eubacterium hominis]
              - - Amedibacterium
                - - Clostridium innocuum
                  - Longicatena
          - - - - Absicoccus
                - Catenisphaera
              - - Faecalitalea
                - Faecalicoccus
            - - Floccifex
              - - Holdemanella
                - - Dubosiella
                  - - Faecalibaculum
                    - - Ileibacterium
                      - Allobaculum

120 marker proteins based GTDB 09-RS220

- Erysipelotrichaceae
  - - - Holdemania Willems et al. 1997
      - - Anaerorhabdus Shah and Collins 1986
        - Bulleidia Downes et al. 2000 (incl. Solobacterium; "Lactomassilus";
          "Anaerolactibacter"; "Galactobacillus"; "Lactimicrobium"; "Stecheria")
    - Erysipelothrix Rosenbach 1909
  - - - Dielma Ramasamy et al. 2016
      - "Traorella" Bonnet et al. 2019
    - - Breznakia Tegtmeier et al. 2016
      - - - Copranaerobaculum Feng et al. 2022
          - "Massilicoli" Ndongo et al. 2019
        - - - Amedibacillus Ikeyama et al. 2020
            - - Eubacterium hominis Liu et al. 2022
              - - Clostridium innocuum Smith & King 1962
                - - Amedibacterium Ikeyama et al. 2020
                  - Longicatena Lagkouvardos et al. 2016
          - - "Merdibacter" Anani et al. 2019
            - - - Dubosiella Cox et al. 2017
                - - Faecalibaculum Chang et al. 2016
                  - - Ileibacterium Cox et al. 2017
                    - Allobaculum Greetham et al. 2006
              - - - Floccifex Wylensek et al. 2021
                  - - Faecalitalea De Maesschalck et al. 2014
                    - Holdemanella De Maesschalck et al. 2014
                - - Faecalicoccus De Maesschalck et al. 2014
                  - - Catenisphaera Kanno et al. 2015
                    - Absicoccus Shin et al. 2020

Unassigned:

- "Ca. Colivicinus" Gilroy et al. 2022
- "Dakotella" Ghimire et al. 2020
- "Grylomicrobium" Hitch et al. 2024
- "Zhonglingia" Huang et al. 2024
