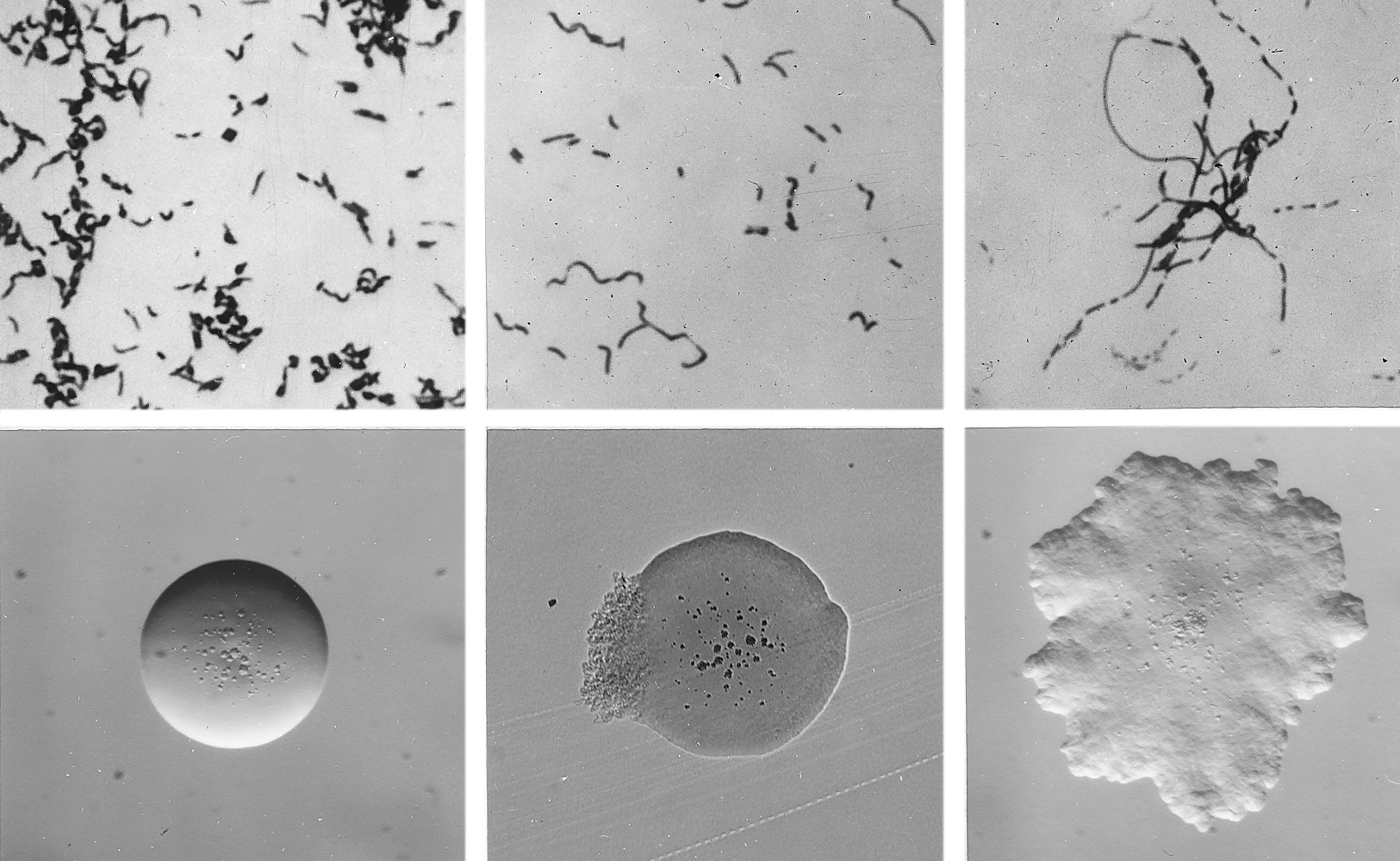
- Cellular and colonial morphology of Erysipelothrix rhusiopathiae. Upper row: ×1200, crystal violet; lower row: ×32

Scientific classification
- Domain: Bacteria
- Kingdom: Bacillati
- Phylum: Bacillota
- Class: Erysipelotrichia; Ludwig, Schleifer & Whitman 2010
- Order: Erysipelotrichales; Ludwig, Schleifer & Whitman 2010

Families
- Coprobacillaceae; Erysipelotrichaceae; Turicibacteraceae

= Erysipelotrichales =

Class of bacteria

The Erysipelotrichia are a class of bacteria of the phylum Bacillota. The only order is Erysipelotrichales. Species of this class are common in the gut microbiome, as they have been isolated from swine manure and increase in composition of the mouse gut microbiome for mice switched to diets high in fat.

This class has the unusual phylogenetic position (according to phylogenomic and 16S rRNA studies) of branching within Mycoplasmatota, a phylum largely without peptidoglycan cell wall. Its ability to make a peptidoglycan and sporulate, combined with this position as well as Mycoplasmotota metagenomes with similar gene contents, imply that the Mycoplasmatotal lineages have independently reduced their cell walls.

== Phylogeny ==
The currently accepted taxonomy is based on the List of Prokaryotic names with Standing in Nomenclature (LPSN) and National Center for Biotechnology Information (NCBI).

16S rRNA based LTP_10_2024

- - Culicoidibacterales
  - - Turicibacteraceae♦
    - - Haloplasmatales
      - - Acholeplasmatales
        - - - Erysipelotrichales
              - - Asteroleplasma Robinson & Freundt 1987
                - Coprobacillaceae♦
              - Erysipelotrichaceae♦
          - Mycoplasmatales

120 marker proteins based GTDB 09-RS220

- - Culicoidibacterales
  - - Turicibacteraceae♦ {MOL361}
    - Haloplasmatales

- Mycoplasmatota Mollicutes
  - "Aphodocolales"
  - - - "Bathyoplasmales" (sic)
      - - "Izemoplasmatales"
        - Acholeplasmatales
    - - - "Caccosomales"
        - - Erysipelotrichales
            - Coprobacillaceae♦
            - Erysipelotrichaceae♦
      - Mycoplasmatales

♦ Paraphyletic Erysipelotrichia
