= Bacillary dysentery =

- Specialty: Infectious diseases

Bacillary dysentery is a type of dysentery, and is a severe form of shigellosis. It is associated with species of bacteria from the family Enterobacteriaceae. The term is usually restricted to Shigella infections.

Shigellosis is caused by one of several types of Shigella bacteria. Three species are associated with bacillary dysentery: Shigella sonnei, Shigella flexneri and Shigella dysenteriae. A study in China indicated that Shigella flexneri 2a was the most common serotype.

Salmonellosis caused by Salmonella enterica (serovar Typhimurium) has also been described as a cause of bacillary dysentery, though this definition is less common. It is sometimes listed as an explicit differential diagnosis of bacillary dysentery, as opposed to a cause.

Bacillary dysentery should not be confused with diarrhea caused by other bacterial infections. One characteristic of bacillary dysentery is blood in stool, which is the result of invasion of the mucosa by the pathogen.

== Pathogenesis ==
Transmission is fecal-oral and is remarkable for the small number of organisms that may cause disease (10 ingested organisms cause illness in 10% of volunteers, and 500 organisms cause disease in 50% of volunteers). Shigella bacteria invade the intestinal mucosal cells but do not usually go beyond the lamina propria. Dysentery is caused when the bacteria escape the epithelial cell phagolysosome, multiply within the cytoplasm, and destroy host cells. Shiga toxin causes hemorrhagic colitis and hemolytic-uremic syndrome by damaging endothelial cells in the microvasculature of the colon and the glomeruli, respectively. In addition, chronic arthritis secondary to S. flexneri infection, called reactive arthritis, may be caused by a bacterial antigen; the occurrence of this syndrome is strongly linked to HLA-B27 genotype, but the immunologic basis of this reaction is not understood.

== Diagnosis ==
Specimen: Fresh stool is collected.

Culture: Specimen is inoculated on selective media like MacConkey's agar, DCA, XLD agar. Selenite F broth(0.4%) is used as enrichment medium which permits the rapid growth of enteric pathogens while inhibiting the growth of normal flora like E. coli for 6–8 hours. Subculture is done on the solid media from selenite F broth. All the solid media are incubated at 37 degrees for 24 hours.

Cultural characteristics: Colorless (NLF) colonies appear on MacConkey's agar which are further confirmed by gram staining, hanging drop preparation and biochemical reactions.

== Treatment ==
Dysentery is initially managed by maintaining fluid intake using oral rehydration therapy. If this treatment cannot be adequately maintained due to vomiting or the profuseness of diarrhea, hospital admission may be required for intravenous fluid replacement. Ideally, no antimicrobial therapy should be administered until microbiological microscopy and culture studies have established the specific infection involved. When laboratory services are not available, it may be necessary to administer a combination of drugs, including an amoebicidal drug to kill the parasite and an antibiotic to treat any associated bacterial infection.

Anyone with bloody diarrhea needs immediate medical help. Treatment often starts with an oral rehydrating solution—water mixed with salt and carbohydrates—to prevent dehydration. (Emergency relief services often distribute inexpensive packets of sugars and mineral salts that can be mixed with clean water and used to restore lifesaving fluids in dehydrated children gravely ill from dysentery.)

If Shigella is suspected and it is not too severe, the doctor may recommend letting it run its course—usually less than a week. The patient will be advised to replace fluids lost through diarrhea. If the infection is severe, the doctor may prescribe antibiotics, such as ciprofloxacin or TMP-SMX (Bactrim). Unfortunately, many strains of Shigella are becoming resistant to common antibiotics, and effective medications are often in short supply in developing countries. If necessary, a doctor may have to reserve antibiotics for those at highest risk for death, including young children, people over 50, and anyone suffering from dehydration or malnutrition.

No vaccine is available. There are several Shigella vaccine candidates in various stages of development that could reduce the incidence of dysentery in endemic countries, as well as in travelers with traveler's diarrhea.

== History ==
The bacterium causing shigellosis is named after Kiyoshi Shiga, a Japanese researcher who discovered it in 1897.
