= Welton Taylor =

American microbiologist and inventor (1919–2012)

Welton Ivan Taylor
- Born: November 12, 1919; Birmingham, Alabama, United States
- Died: November 1, 2012 (aged 92); Chicago, Illinois, U.S.
- Education: University of Illinois at Urbana-Champaign
- Known for: Salmonella test, XLD agar
- Awards: National Inventors Hall of Fame, inducted 2016; naming of Enterobacter taylorae
- Scientific career
- Fields: Microbiology

Welton Ivan Taylor (November 12, 1919 – November 1, 2012) was an American microbiologist, inventor and civil rights activist. He is known for his work on food-borne pathogens, notably for developing tests for Salmonella and for inventing the XLD (Xylose Lysine Deoxycholate) agar, which can be used to isolate Salmonella and Shigella bacteria.

After obtaining his PhD at the University of Illinois at Urbana-Champaign, and research relevant to infections of soldiers' wounds at the university's College of Medicine, Taylor joined the food processing company Swift & Company, developing for them an accurate test for the contamination of food with salmonella. This set the direction for his subsequent research, undertaken mostly at Microbiologist-in-Chief at Chicago's Children's Memorial Hospital, on different ways of detecting specific pathogens accurately and quickly, in a clinical setting.

Taylor was a life-long civil-rights activist, promoting racial equality and working towards de-segregation.

In 2016, Taylor was inducted into the National Inventors Hall of Fame. In 1985, a species of bacteria was named jointly after Taylor and an eponymous colleague.

== Life ==
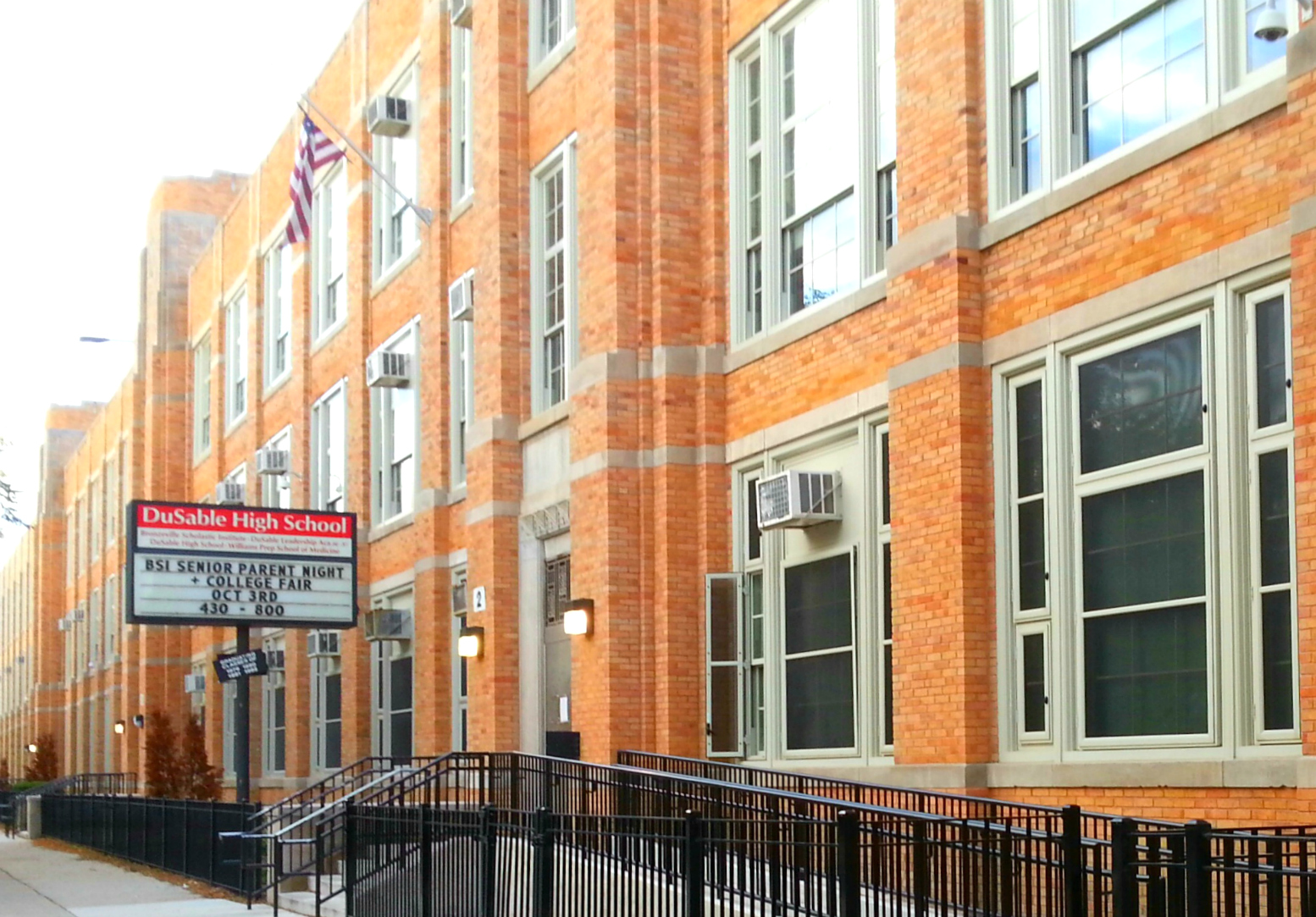
DuSable High School in Bronzeville

Taylor was born in Birmingham, Alabama on November 12, 1919. A few weeks after his birth, his family was forced to move because Taylor's mother had inadvertently discovered the identity of a local Ku Klux Klan leader. The family moved first to Chicago, then to Peoria, and eventually back to the Bronzeville neighborhood of Chicago, where Taylor attended DuSable High School. He graduated from high school in 1937 as valedictorian of his class.

With the help of local African-American businessmen active in the Kappa Alpha Psi fraternity, who had been impressed with his academic performance in high school, Taylor was able to attend the University of Illinois at Urbana-Champaign, earning a bachelor's degree in bacteriology in 1941. At the university, Taylor was a Reserve Officers' Training Corps cadet.

When World War II broke out, Taylor enlisted in the U.S. Army, serving in the South Pacific theater of operations as a liaison pilot for the Army Field Artillery, that is, using air surveillance to help direct field artillery fire. His unit was the 93rd Infantry Division, a segregated unit that had already fought in World War I.

After the war, Taylor returned to his alma mater on the G.I. Bill to complete his M.S. degree in the same subject in 1947, and a PhD degree in 1948. For his PhD, Taylor studied "The growth and toxin production of Clostridium botulinum in cottage cheese".

Throughout his career, including his service in an army that was, at the time, still subject to Jim Crow rules, Taylor was confronted with anti-black racism. He recounts a number of such confrontations in the memoirs he wrote on his time in the army, published in 2012. As a civil rights activist, Taylor promoted racial equality, including work with white veterans in Urbana-Champaign with the aim of de-segregating restaurants, movie theaters and public swimming pools. Taylor was one of the first African Americans to integrate Chicago's Chatham neighborhood, serving as president of the Chatham Avalon Park Community Council.

Taylor married Jayne Rowena Kemp in 1945, and had two daughters, whose names are Karyn and Shelley. Taylor and Jayne were married for many years until Jayne died in 2005.

== Scientific career ==
In 1948, Taylor joined the faculty at the University of Illinois College of Medicine. As research subjects, he chose gas gangrene and tetanus, both of which were infections relevant to the military as complications of soldiers' wounds. Taylor and his colleague Milan Novak found that penicillin could be used as prophylaxis for both diseases.

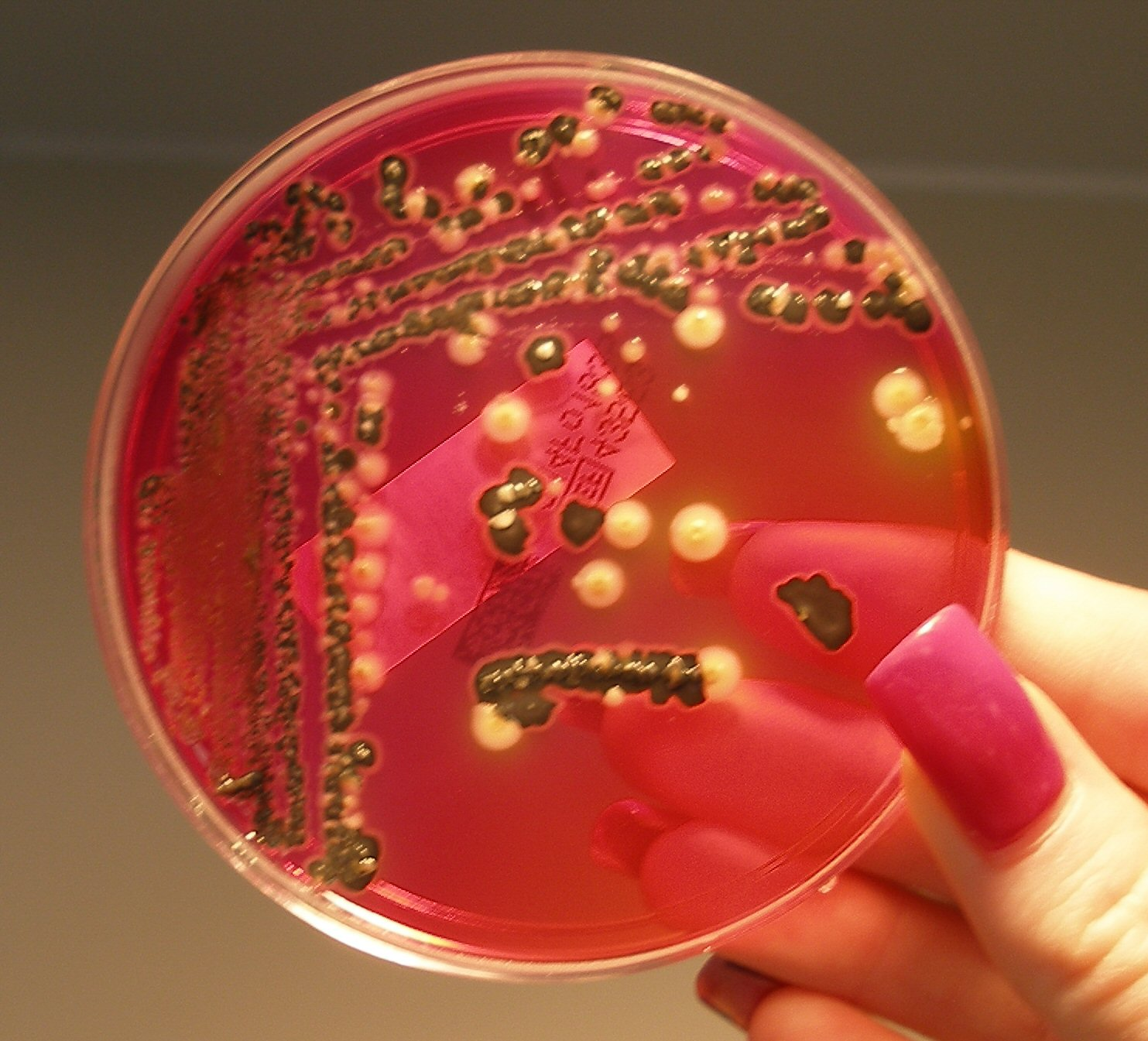
Salmonella growing on XLD agar, an agar developed by Taylor in 1965

Between 1954 and 1959, Taylor worked at the food processing company Swift & Company. When there was an outbreak of salmonella at the company, Taylor, with his colleague John Silliker, developed an accurate test that could be used to test egg yolks for salmonella. The testing method is still in use today. Taylor and Silliker jointly took out a patent on a new method of destroying food-borne bacteria using bacteriophages in 1959.

In 1959, Taylor left the company to take up a post as Microbiologist-in-Chief at Chicago's Children's Memorial Hospital. With a Special Research Fellowship from the National Institute of Allergy and Infectious Diseases, Taylor spent 1961 at Britain's Central Public Health Laboratory in Colindale and France's Pasteur Institute in Lille, helping to develop procedures aimed at preventing salmonella poisoning caused by meat imports.

Upon his return to Children's Memorial Hospital in 1962, Taylor went on to develop rapid testing methods for two more classes of bacteria known to cause food poisoning, notably Shigellae – one of the leading bacterial causes of diarrhea worldwide – and Enterobacteriaceae, obtaining several patents. The methods he developed were adopted internationally as part of the ongoing effort to keep processed food safe. Taylor acted as a consultant for eleven Chicago-area hospitals, seven corporations, three government agencies, as well as for the Center for Disease Control on subjects ranging from toxic shock syndrome and Legionnaires' disease to sexually transmitted diseases and AIDS.

In 1965, Taylor developed the XLD agar, which can be used to isolate Salmonella and Shigella bacterial species both from clinical samples and from food. This agar remains a standard diagnostic tool of clinical microbiology, and is particularly well-suited for routine diagnostic work on Salmonella enterica.

In 1975, Taylor was one of the founders of the Journal of Clinical Microbiology, which is published by the American Society for Microbiology; he also served as one of the journal's editors from 1975 to 1983.

In pursuit of his research, Taylor set about combining different culture media in a form that would allow for easy identification of different bacteria in a clinical setting. For the resulting "Device for Use in the Identification of Microorganisms", which includes different compartments with specific culture media allowing for accurate and fast identification, a patent was issued to Taylor on March 1, 1977. The device was approved by the FDA as well as by food-safety regulatory agencies in Canada and in Europe as a means of certifying food as bacteria free. Taylor founded Micro-Palettes Inc. in order to commercialize devices of this type, but the company was dissolved in 1988.

== Honors and awards ==
Taylor's inventions in the area of food testing eventually led to his induction into the National Inventors Hall of Fame in 2016.

In 1985, a group of researchers from the Center for Disease Control named a newly identified Enterobacter bacterium Enterobacter taylorae in honor of both the British bacteriologist Joan Taylor and Welton Taylor. The citation reads "The name also honors Welton Taylor, an American clinical microbiologist who has also made many contributions to our knowledge of the family Enterobacteriaceae, particularly the development of the XLD agar and the isolation of Shigella and other bacterial pathogens from feces.
