= Eggerthia catenaformis =

Scientific classification
- Domain: Bacteria
- Kingdom: Bacillati
- Phylum: Bacillota
- Class: Erysipelotrichia
- Order: Erysipelotrichales
- Family: Coprobacillaceae
- Genus: Eggerthia
- Species: E. catenaformis

Binomial name
- Eggerthia catenaformis (Eggerth 1935) Salvetti et al. 2011

Type strain
- ATCC 25536, CCUG 48174

Synonyms
- Bacteroides catenaformis, Catenabacterium catenaforme

Species of bacterium

Eggerthia catenaformis is an anaerobic, Gram-positive, non-spore-forming rod-shaped bacterium. It is an uncommon cause of infection in humans and is known to be associated with dental abscess.
