= Coprobacillus cateniformis =

Scientific classification
- Domain: Bacteria
- Kingdom: Bacillati
- Phylum: Bacillota
- Class: Erysipelotrichia
- Order: Erysipelotrichales
- Family: Coprobacillaceae
- Genus: Coprobacillus
- Species: C. cateniformis

Binomial name
- Coprobacillus cateniformis Kageyama and Benno 2000

Type strain
- CIP 106690, JCM 10604, RCA1-24

Synonyms
- Coprobacillus catenaformis

Species of bacterium

Coprobacillus cateniformis is a bacterium from the genus Coprobacillus which has been isolated from human feces in Japan.
