= XLT =

XLT may refer to:

- Xlt (file format), a Microsoft Excel template file
- XLT agar, a culture medium used to isolate salmonellae from samples
- X linked thrombocytopenia, an inherited blood clotting disorder
- Litecoin, a crypto-currency
- A mid-range trim level for Ford trucks and sport utility vehicles, including the Ford Ranger

== See also ==
- XLT86
