= EIEC =

EIEC may refer to:

- Enteroinvasive Escherichia coli, a bacterium
- Encyclopedia of Indo-European Culture, an encyclopedia
