= Sereny test =

The Sereny test is a test used to test the invasiveness of enteroinvasive Escherichia coli, Shigella species, and Listeria monocytogenes.

It is done by inoculating suspension of bacteria into guinea pig's eye. Severe mucopurulent conjunctivitis and severe keratitis indicates a positive test.
