= XLT agar =

Selective culture medium

XLT Agar (Xylose Lysine Tergitol-4) is a selective culture medium for the isolation and identification of salmonellae from food and environmental samples. It is similar to XLD agar; however, the agar is supplemented with the surfactant, Tergitol 4, which causes inhibition of Proteus spp. and other non-Salmonellae. Successful growth of Salmonella will result in growth of red colonies with a black centre.

- XLT Agar contains:

Proteose Peptone	1.6g/l
Yeast extract	3g/l
L-Lysine	5g/l
Xylose	3.75g/l
Lactose	7.5g/l
Sucrose	7.5g/l
Sodium chloride	5g/l
Sodium thiosulphate	6.8g/l
Ferric ammonium citrate	0.8 mg/l
Phenol red	0.08g/l
Agar	18g/l
Tergitol-4	4.6mL/l

== See also ==
- Agar plate
- XLD agar
- R2a agar
- MRS agar
