= Carl Sonne =

Carl Sonne may refer to:

- Carl Edvard Sonne (1804–1878), Danish printmaker
- Carl Olaf Sonne (1882–1948), Danish bacteriologist and parasitologist
