= XLD =

XLD may refer to:

- Xylose lysine deoxycholate or XLD agar, a growth medium for bacterial cultures
- The XLD connector, a keyed variant of the XLR connector
- An old Microsoft Excel file format
