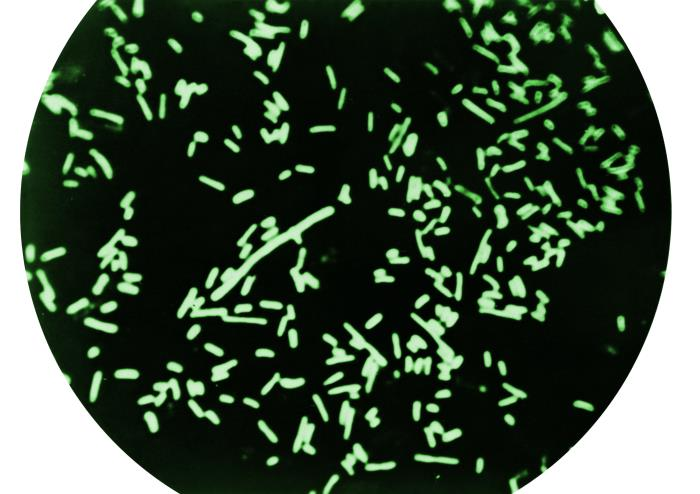
- Dark-field microscopy revealing Shigella dysenteriae bacteria

Scientific classification
- Domain: Bacteria
- Kingdom: Pseudomonadati
- Phylum: Pseudomonadota
- Class: Gammaproteobacteria
- Order: Enterobacterales
- Family: Enterobacteriaceae
- Genus: Shigella
- Species: S. dysenteriae

Binomial name
- Shigella dysenteriae (Shiga 1897); Castellani & Chalmers 1919

= Shigella dysenteriae =

Bacterial species

Shigella dysenteriae is a species of the rod-shaped bacterial genus Shigella. Shigella species can cause shigellosis (bacillary dysentery). Shigellae are gram-negative, non-spore-forming, facultatively anaerobic, nonmotile bacteria. S. dysenteriae has the ability to invade and replicate in various species of epithelial cells and enterocytes.

== Signs and symptoms ==
The most commonly observed signs associated with Shigella dysentery include colitis, malnutrition, rectal prolapse, tenesmus, reactive arthritis, and central nervous system problems. Further, S. dysenteriae is associated with the development of hemolytic-uremic syndrome, which includes anemia, thrombocytopenia, and kidney failure. If infected with S. dysenteriae, an individual will experience a severe case of shigellosis. Mortality is higher with S. dysenteriae type 1. Most cases of shigellosis are in developing countries. Shigellosis outbreaks in Asia, Latin America and Africa have had mortality rates of up to 20%.

== Diagnosis ==
Diagnosis was historically made through isolation of the bacterium from a stool culture. Due to the abundance of bacterial flora in most stool specimens, laboratory media that are selective for Gram-negative rods such as XLD agar, DCA agar, or Hektoen enteric agar, are used. Colorless colonies are observed as the organism is not a lactose fermenter. Inoculation of a TSI slant shows an alkaline slant and acid base, with no gas or H_{2}S production. Following incubation on SIM, the culture appears nonmotile with no H_{2}S production. Addition of Kovac's reagent to the SIM tube following growth typically indicates no indole formation (serotypes 2, 7, and 8 produce indole). Mannitol tests yields negative results. Ornithine Decarboxylase tests yield negative results.

== Treatment ==
Treatment for shigellosis, independent of the subspecies, requires an antibiotic. Commonly used antibiotics include ampicillin, ciprofloxacin, ceftriaxone, among others. Opioids should be avoided for treatment of Shigellosis.

== Epidemiology ==
Shigella infections may be contracted by a lack of monitoring of water and food quality, unsanitary cooking conditions and improper hygiene practices. S. dysenteriae spreads through contaminated water and food, causes minor dysentery because of its Shiga toxin, but other species may also be dysentery agents. S. dysenteriae releases an exotoxin that compromises the gut and central nervous system. If acting as an enterotoxin, diarrhea will occur. When acting as a neurotoxin, severe cases of shigellosis are developed, inducing comas and meningismus.

Contamination is often caused by bacteria on unwashed hands during food preparation, or soiled hands reaching the mouth.

== See also ==
- Hand washing
