= C23H38O4 =

The molecular formula C_{23}H_{38}O_{4} (molar mass: 378.54 g/mol, exact mass: 378.2770 u) may refer to:

- Apocholic acid
- 2-Arachidonoylglycerol (2-AG)
