= Faecalibacillus intestinalis =

Scientific classification
- Domain: Bacteria
- Kingdom: Bacillati
- Phylum: Bacillota
- Class: Erysipelotrichia
- Order: Erysipelotrichales
- Family: Coprobacillaceae
- Genus: Faecalibacillus
- Species: F. intestinalis

Binomial name
- Faecalibacillus intestinalis Seo et al. 2019

Species of bacterium

Faecalibacillus intestinalis is a species of obligately anaerobic, Gram-positive bacteria first isolated from the feces of healthy Korean people. The bacterium is rod-shaped and non-spore-forming. First isolated in 2019, it is one of two members of the genus Faecalibacillus alongside F. faecis. Individual bacterial cells are approximately 3.5–4.5 micrometers in length and 0.3–0.4 micrometers in width. The type strain of this species is SNUG30099T (=KCTC 15631T=JCM 32256T).
