= Kandleria vitulina =

Scientific classification
- Domain: Bacteria
- Kingdom: Bacillati
- Phylum: Bacillota
- Class: Erysipelotrichia
- Order: Erysipelotrichales
- Family: Coprobacillaceae
- Genus: Kandleria
- Species: K. vitulina

Binomial name
- Kandleria vitulina (Sharpe et al. 1973) Salvetti et al. 2011

Type strain
- ATCC 27783, ATCC 27783, CCUG 32236, CIP 103154, DSM 20405, JCM 1143, LMG 18931, NRRL B-14854

Synonyms
- Lactobacillus vitulinus

Species of bacterium

Kandleria vitulina is a bacterium from the genus Kandleria isolated from calf rumen.

Previously classified as Lactobacillus vitulinus, it has been reclassified based on phylogenetic information.
