= DTDP-4-amino-4,6-dideoxy-D-glucose acyltransferase =

Identifiers
- EC no.: 2.3.1.209

Databases
- IntEnz: IntEnz view
- BRENDA: BRENDA entry
- ExPASy: NiceZyme view
- KEGG: KEGG entry
- MetaCyc: metabolic pathway
- PRIAM: profile
- PDB structures: RCSB PDB PDBe PDBsum
Search
- PMC: articles
- PubMed: articles
- NCBI: proteins

DTDP-4-amino-4,6-dideoxy-D-glucose acyltransferase (EC 2.3.1.209, VIOB) is an enzyme with systematic name acetyl-CoA:dTDP-4-amino-4,6-dideoxy-alpha-D-glucose N-acetyltransferase. This enzyme catalyses the following chemical reaction

acetyl-CoA + dTDP-4-amino-4,6-dideoxy-alpha-D-glucose $\rightleftharpoons$ CoA + dTDP-4-acetamido-4,6-dideoxy-alpha-D-glucose

4-acetamido-4,6-dideoxy-alpha-D-glucose is part of the O antigens of Shigella dysenteriae type 7 and Escherichia coli O7.
