= Catenibacterium mitsuokai =

Scientific classification
- Domain: Bacteria
- Kingdom: Bacillati
- Phylum: Bacillota
- Class: Erysipelotrichia
- Order: Erysipelotrichales
- Family: Coprobacillaceae
- Genus: Catenibacterium
- Species: C. mitsuokai

Binomial name
- Catenibacterium mitsuokai Kageyama & Benno 2000

Type strain
- CCUG 48821 A, CCUG 48821 B, CIP 106738, DSM 15897, JCM 10609, RCA 14‑39

Synonyms
- Catenabacterium mitsuokai

Species of bacterium

Catenibacterium mitsuokai is a species of Gram-positive and strictly anaerobic bacteria in the genus Catenibacterium, first described in 2000 following isolation from human feces in Japan.

== Ecology and distribution ==
In addition to humans, C. mitsuokai has been recovered from the lower gastrointestinal tract of pigs.

== Etymology ==
The genus name Catenibacterium is derived from Latin catena (a chain) and bacterium (a rod), referring to the bacterium's chain-forming morphology. The species epithet mitsuokai is the genitive form of Mitsuoka, honoring K. Mitsuoka, a Japanese microbiologist.
