= Kandleria =

Scientific classification
- Domain: Bacteria
- Kingdom: Bacillati
- Phylum: Bacillota
- Class: Erysipelotrichia
- Order: Erysipelotrichales
- Family: Coprobacillaceae
- Genus: Kandleria; Salvetti et al. 2011

Type species
- Kandleria vitulina (Sharpe et al. 1973) Salvetti et al. 2011

Species
- Kandleria vitulina

Genus of bacteria

Kandleria is a genus from the family Coprobacillaceae, with one known species, Kandleria vitulina.
