= Beduini =

Scientific classification
- Domain: Bacteria
- Kingdom: Bacillati
- Phylum: Bacillota
- Class: Erysipelotrichia
- Order: Erysipelotrichales
- Family: Coprobacillaceae
- Genus: Beduini; Mourembou et al. 2015

Type species
- Beduini massiliensis Mourembou et al. 2015

Species
- B. massiliensis

Genus of bacteria

Beduini is a Gram-negative bacterial genus from the family of Clostridiaceae, with one known species (Beduini massiliensis).

== See also ==
- List of bacterial orders
- List of bacteria genera
