= M Elisabeth Sharpe =

English microbiologist

- Born: 1916; Barnsley, Yorkshire
- Died: 1998 (aged 81–82)
- Other name: Becky
- Education: University College London (BSc, 1937); University of Reading (PhD; 1951)
- Known for: Joint editorship of the Journal of Dairy Research; development of the MRS agar
- Scientific career
- Fields: Dairy microbiology
- Workplaces: National Institute for Research in Dairying

M Elisabeth Sharpe (1916 – 1998) was a British microbiologist. She is best known for her contributions to the field of dairy microbiology and the development of the MRS agar for the isolation and cultivation of Lactobacillus species.

== Research and career ==
Sharpe attended University College London where she gained a Bachelor of Science degree in 1937. Between 1942 and 1946, Sharpe worked for The Boots Company, where she was involved in research into the pharmacological properties of notatin, before returning to the National Institute for Research in Dairying in Shinfield where remained until her retirement from research in 1978. She received a PhD from the University of Reading in 1951 after completing research on group D streptococci isolated from cheese and the faeces of healthy and sick infants.

Sharpe's later research focussed on dairy microbiology, with her research involving developing new techniques for the identification and classification of gram-positive bacteria, including species belonging to the Lactobacilli genus. In 1960, Sharpe was involved in the invention of the MRS agar along with de Mann and Rogosa; the agar, an adapted form of the Lactobacillus selective Rogosa agar that allows for better growth of fastidious strains, is still used today.

Sharpe was also a contributor and editor of the first edition of Bergey's Manual of Systematic Bacteriology. In 1975, Sharpe become the joint editor of the Journal of Dairy Research, a role in which she remained until her retirement in 1988. In 2008, the genus Sharpea was named in honour of Sharpe's contributions to the development of evolutionary microbiology.

In 1973, Sharpe was awarded a DSc degree from the University of London. After fourteen years as a joint editor of the Journal of Dairy Research, Sharpe retired in 1988 before her death in 1999.

== Selected publications ==
- Sharpe, M E (1955). "A serological classification of lactobacilli". Journal of General Microbiology. 12 (1): 107–122. doi:10.1099/00221287-12-1-107. PMID 14354139.
- Sharpe, M (1955). "Haptene substances in culture media for lactobacilli". Journal of General Microbiology. 13 (1): 198–199. doi:10.1099/00221287-13-1-198. PMID 13252230.
- Dacre, J C; Sharpe, M E (1956). "Catalase production by Lactobacilli". Nature. 178 (700): 700. Bibcode:1956Natur.178..700D. doi:10.1038/178700a0.
- Goulden, J D; Sharpe, M E (1958). "The infra-red absorption spectra of lactobacilli". Journal of General Microbiology. 19 (1): 76–86. doi:10.1099/00221287-19-1-76. PMID 13575756.
- De Man, J C; Rogosa, M; Sharpe, M E (1960). "A medium for the culture of lactobacilli". Journal of Applied Bacteriology. 23 (1): 130–135. doi:10.1111/j.1365-2672.1960.tb00188.x.
- Sharpe, M E; Davison, A L; Baddiley, J (1964). "Teichoic acids and group antigens in Lactobacilli". Journal of General Microbiology. 34 (2): 333–340. doi:10.1099/00221287-34-2-333. PMID 14135540.
- Latham, M J; Sharpe, M E; Sutton, J D (1971). "The microbial flora of the rumen of cows fed hay and high cereal rations and its relationship to the rumen fermentation". Journal of Applied Bacteriology. 34 (2): 425–434. doi:10.1111/j.1365-2672.1971.tb02302.x. PMID 4939274.
- Latham, M J; Storry, J E; Sharpe, M E (1972). "Effect of low-roughage diets on the microflora and lipid metabolism in the rumen". Applied Microbiology. 24 (6): 871–877. doi:10.1128/am.24.6.871-877.1972. PMC 380689. PMID 16349951.
- Sharpe, M E; et al. (1973). "Two new species of Lactobacillus isolated from the bovine rumen, Lactobacillus ruminis sp.nov. and Lactobacillus vitulinus sp.nov". Journal of General Microbiology. 77 (1): 37–49. doi:10.1099/00221287-77-1-37. PMID 4723944.
- Sharpe, M E; Hill, L R; Lapage, S P (1973). "Pathogenic lactobacilli". Journal of Medical Microbiology. 6 (3): 281–286. doi:10.1099/00222615-6-3-281. PMID 4199269.
- Jacques, N A; Brown, R A; Sharpe, M E; Fitzgerald, R J (1980). "Characterization of two strains of cariogenic lactobacilli". Journal of General Microbiology. 118 (1): 283–286. doi:10.1099/00221287-118-1-283. PMID 7420055.
