= Coprobacillus =

Scientific classification
- Domain: Bacteria
- Kingdom: Bacillati
- Phylum: Bacillota
- Class: Erysipelotrichia
- Order: Erysipelotrichales
- Family: Coprobacillaceae
- Genus: Coprobacillus; Kageyama and Benno 2000

Type species
- Coprobacillus cateniformis corrig. Kageyama & Benno 2000

Species
- Coprobacillus cateniformis

Genus of bacteria

Coprobacillus is a Gram-positive, obligate anaerobic and non-motile genus from the family Coprobacillaceae, with one known species (Coprobacillus cateniformis).
