= Shigellosis =

Infection of the intestines by Shigella bacteria

- Other names: Bacillary dysentery, Marlow syndrome
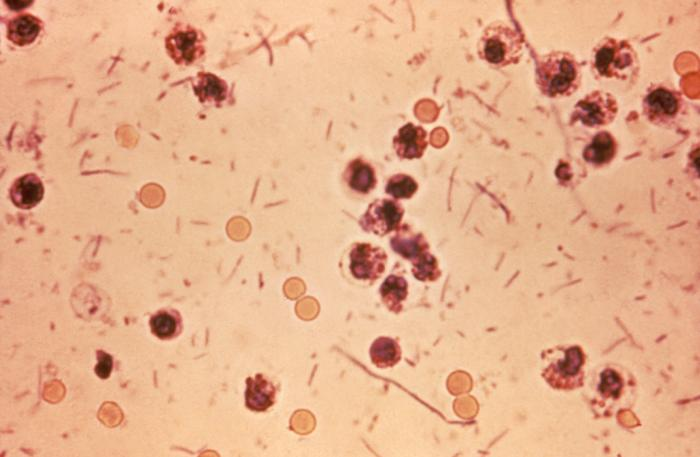
- Shigella seen in a stool sample
- Specialty: Infectious disease
- Symptoms: Diarrhea, fever, abdominal pain
- Complications: Reactive arthritis, sepsis, seizures, hemolytic uremic syndrome
- Usual onset: 1–2 days post exposure
- Duration: Usually 5–7 days
- Causes: Shigella
- Diagnostic method: Stool culture
- Prevention: Handwashing
- Treatment: Drinking fluids and rest
- Medication: Antibiotics (severe cases)
- Frequency: >80 million
- Deaths: 700,000

Shigellosis, known historically as dysentery, is an infection of the intestines caused by Shigella bacteria. Symptoms generally start one to two days after exposure and include diarrhea, fever, abdominal pain, and feeling the need to pass stools even when the bowels are empty. The diarrhea may be bloody. Symptoms typically last five to seven days and it may take several months before bowel habits return entirely to normal. Complications can include reactive arthritis, sepsis, seizures, and hemolytic uremic syndrome.

Shigellosis is caused by four specific types of Shigella. These are typically spread by exposure to infected feces. This can occur via contaminated food, water, hands or sexual contact. Contamination may be spread by flies or when changing diapers (nappies). Diagnosis is by stool culture.

The risk of infection can be reduced by properly washing the hands. There is no vaccine. Shigellosis usually resolves without specific treatment. Rest, and sufficient fluids by mouth, are recommended. Bismuth subsalicylate may help with the symptoms; however, medications that slow the bowels such as loperamide are not recommended. In severe cases antibiotics may be used but resistance is common. Commonly used antibiotics include ciprofloxacin and azithromycin.

A 2005 report by the World Health Organization estimated that shigellosis occurs in at least 80 million people and results in about 700,000 deaths a year globally. Most cases occur in the developing world. Young children are most commonly affected. Outbreaks of disease may occur in childcare settings and schools. It is also relatively common among travelers. In the United States about half a million cases occur a year.

== Signs and symptoms ==
Signs and symptoms may range from mild abdominal discomfort to severe dysentery characterized by cramps, diarrhea, with slimy-consistent stools, fever, blood, pus, or mucus in stools or tenesmus. Onset time is 12 to 96 hours, and recovery takes 5 to 7 days. Infections are associated with mucosal ulceration, rectal bleeding, and drastic dehydration. Reactive arthritis and hemolytic uremic syndrome are possible sequelae that have been reported in the aftermath of shigellosis.

The most common neurological symptom includes seizures.

== Cause ==
=== Bacteria ===
Shigellosis is caused by a bacterial infection with Shigella, a bacterium that is genetically similar to and was once classified as E. coli. There are three serogroups and one serotype of Shigella:

- Shigella flexneri
- Shigella boydii
- Shigella dysenteriae and
- Shigella sonnei (serotype)

The probability of being infected by any given strain of Shigella varies around the world. For instance, S. sonnei is the most common in the United States, while S. dysenteriae and S. boydii are rare there.

=== Transmission ===
Shigella is transmitted through the fecal-oral route of individuals infected with the disease, whether or not they are exhibiting symptoms. Long-term carriers of the bacteria are rare. The bacteria can infect not just humans but other primates as well.

== Mechanism ==
Upon ingestion, the bacteria pass through the gastrointestinal tract until they reach the small intestine. There they begin to multiply until they reach the large intestine. In the large intestine, the bacteria cause cell injury and the beginning stages of shigellosis via two main mechanisms: direct invasion of epithelial cells in the large intestine and production of enterotoxin 1 and enterotoxin 2.

Unlike other bacteria, Shigella is not destroyed by the gastric acid in the stomach. As a result, it takes only 10 to 200 cells to cause an infection. This infectious dose is several orders of magnitude smaller than that of other species of bacteria (e.g., cholera, caused by the bacterium Vibrio cholerae, has an infectious dose between 10^{8} and 10^{11} cells).

== Diagnosis ==
The diagnosis of shigellosis is made by isolating the organism from diarrheal fecal sample cultures. Shigella species are negative for motility and are generally not lactose fermenters, but S. sonnei can ferment lactose. They typically do not produce gas from carbohydrates (with the exception of certain strains of S. flexneri) and tend to be overall biochemically inert. Shigella should also be urea hydrolysis negative. When inoculated to a triple sugar iron slant, they react as follows: K/A, gas -, and H_{2}S -. Indole reactions are mixed, positive and negative, with the exception of S. sonnei, which is always indole negative. Growth on Hektoen enteric agar produces bluish-green colonies for Shigella and bluish-green colonies with black centers for Salmonella.

== Prevention ==
Simple precautions can be taken to prevent getting shigellosis: wash hands before handling food and thoroughly cook all food before eating. The primary prevention methods are improved sanitation and personal and food hygiene, but a low-cost and efficacious vaccine would complement these methods.

Since shigellosis is spread very quickly among children, keeping infected children out of daycare for 24 hours after their symptoms have disappeared, will decrease the occurrence of shigellosis in daycares.

=== Vaccine ===
Currently, no licensed vaccine targeting Shigella exists. Several vaccine candidates for Shigella are in various stages of development including live attenuated, conjugate, ribosomal, and proteosome vaccines. Shigella has been a longstanding World Health Organization target for vaccine development, and sharp declines in age-specific diarrhea/dysentery attack rates for this pathogen indicate that natural immunity does develop following exposure; thus, vaccination to prevent the disease should be feasible. Shigella species are resistant to many antibiotics, so vaccination is an important part of the strategy to reduce morbidity and mortality.

== Treatment ==
Treatment consists mainly of replacing fluids and salts lost because of diarrhea. Replacement by mouth is satisfactory for most people, but some may need to receive fluids intravenously. Antidiarrheal drugs (such as diphenoxylate or loperamide) may prolong the infection and should not be used.

=== Antibiotics ===
Antibiotics should only be used in severe cases or for certain populations with mild symptoms (elderly, immunocompromised, food service industry workers, child care workers). For Shigella-associated diarrhea, antibiotics shorten the length of infection, but they are usually avoided in mild cases because many Shigella strains are becoming resistant to common antibiotics. Furthermore, effective medications are often in short supply in developing countries, which carry the majority of the disease burden from Shigella. Antidiarrheal agents may worsen the sickness, and should be avoided.

In most cases, the disease resolves within four to eight days without antibiotics. Severe infections may last three to six weeks. Antibiotics, such as trimethoprim-sulfamethoxazole, ciprofloxacin may be given when the person is very young or very old, when the disease is severe, or when the risk of the infection spreading to other people is high. Additionally, ampicillin (but not amoxicillin) was effective in treating this disease previously, but now the first choice of drug is pivmecillinam.

== Epidemiology ==
Insufficient data exist, but it is estimated to have caused the death of 34,000 children under the age of five in 2013, and 40,000 deaths in people over five years of age. Shigella also causes about 580,000 cases annually among travelers and military personnel from industrialized countries.

An estimated 500,000 cases of shigellosis occur annually in the United States. Infants, the elderly, and the critically ill are susceptible to the most severe symptoms of disease, but all humans are susceptible to some degree. Individuals with acquired immune deficiency syndrome (AIDS) are more frequently infected with Shigella. Shigellosis is a more common and serious condition in the developing world; fatality rates of shigellosis epidemics in developing countries can be 5–15%.

Orthodox Jewish communities (OJCs) are a known risk group for shigellosis; Shigella sonnei is cyclically epidemic in these communities in Israel, with sporadic outbreaks occurring elsewhere among these communities. "Through phylogenetic and genomic analysis, we showed that strains from outbreaks in OJCs outside of Israel are distinct from strains in the general population and relate to a single multidrug-resistant sublineage of S. sonnei that prevails in Israel. Further Bayesian phylogenetic analysis showed that this strain emerged approximately 30 years ago, demonstrating the speed at which antimicrobial drug–resistant pathogens can spread widely through geographically dispersed, but internationally connected, communities."

== See also ==
- Gastroenteritis
- Shiga-like toxin
- Shiga toxin
- Traveler's diarrhea
