= Faecalibacillus =

Scientific classification
- Domain: Bacteria
- Kingdom: Bacillati
- Phylum: Bacillota
- Class: Erysipelotrichia
- Order: Erysipelotrichales
- Family: Coprobacillaceae
- Genus: Faecalibacillus; Seo et al. 2019

Type species
- Faecalibacillus intestinalis Seo et al. 2019

Species
- F. faecis; F. hominis; F. intestinalis

Genus of bacteria

Faecalibacillus is a genus of Gram-positive, obligately anaerobic, non-spore-forming, rod-shaped bacteria in the family Erysipelotrichaceae. The type species is Faecalibacillus intestinalis. Three species have validly published and correct names.

The trees below compare a 16S rRNA gene phylogeny from LTP_10_2024 with a genome-based phylogeny from GTDB release R11-RS232. Only species with validly published names are shown. F. hominis is not included because it is not represented under its current name in either release.

16S rRNA based LTP_10_2024

- Faecalibacillus
  - F. faecis Seo et al. 2019
  - F. intestinalis Seo et al. 2019

120 marker proteins based GTDB R11-RS232

- Faecalibacillus
  - F. faecis
  - F. intestinalis
