= Sharpea =

Scientific classification
- Domain: Bacteria
- Kingdom: Bacillati
- Phylum: Bacillota
- Class: Erysipelotrichia
- Order: Erysipelotrichales
- Family: Coprobacillaceae
- Genus: Sharpea; Morita et al., 2008

Type species
- Sharpea azabuensis

Species
- Sharpea azabuensis; Sharpea porci

Genus of bacteria

Sharpea is a genus of Gram-positive, strictly anaerobic, non-spore-forming bacteria within the family Coprobacillaceae. Species of this genus produce lactic acid and have been isolated from the gastrointestinal tracts of various mammals. The genus was first described in 2008 following the isolation of its type species, Sharpea azabuensis.

== Taxonomy ==
The genus Sharpea was established in 2008 based on phylogenetic analysis of the 16S rRNA gene sequence from a bacterial strain isolated from horse feces in Japan. Sharpea belongs to the family Coprobacillaceae, within the order Erysipelotrichales. The genus name honors microbiologist M Elisabeth Sharpe, recognizing her contributions to the field of microbiology.

== Species ==
Currently, the genus Sharpea includes two validly published species:

- Sharpea azabuensis Morita et al., 2008 – type species isolated from the feces of thoroughbred horses.
- Sharpea porci Wylensek et al., 2020 – isolated from the intestine of pigs.

== Morphology and physiology ==
Members of the genus Sharpea share the following characteristics:

- Gram-positive rods
- Strict anaerobes
- Non-spore-forming
- Primarily ferment carbohydrates, producing lactic acid as a metabolic end product.

== See also ==
- Gut microbiota
