= Carl Olaf Sonne =

Danish bacteriologist and parasitologist

Carl Olaf Sonne (16 April 1882, Svaneke, Denmark – 3 June 1948, Copenhagen, Denmark) was a Danish bacteriologist and parasitologist who discovered the Shigella sonnei strain of shigella bacterium.
