= John Boyd (bacteriologist) =

Scottish bacteriologist and a senior officer in the Royal Army Medical Corps (RAMC)

Brigadier Sir John Boyd OBE FRS FRCP
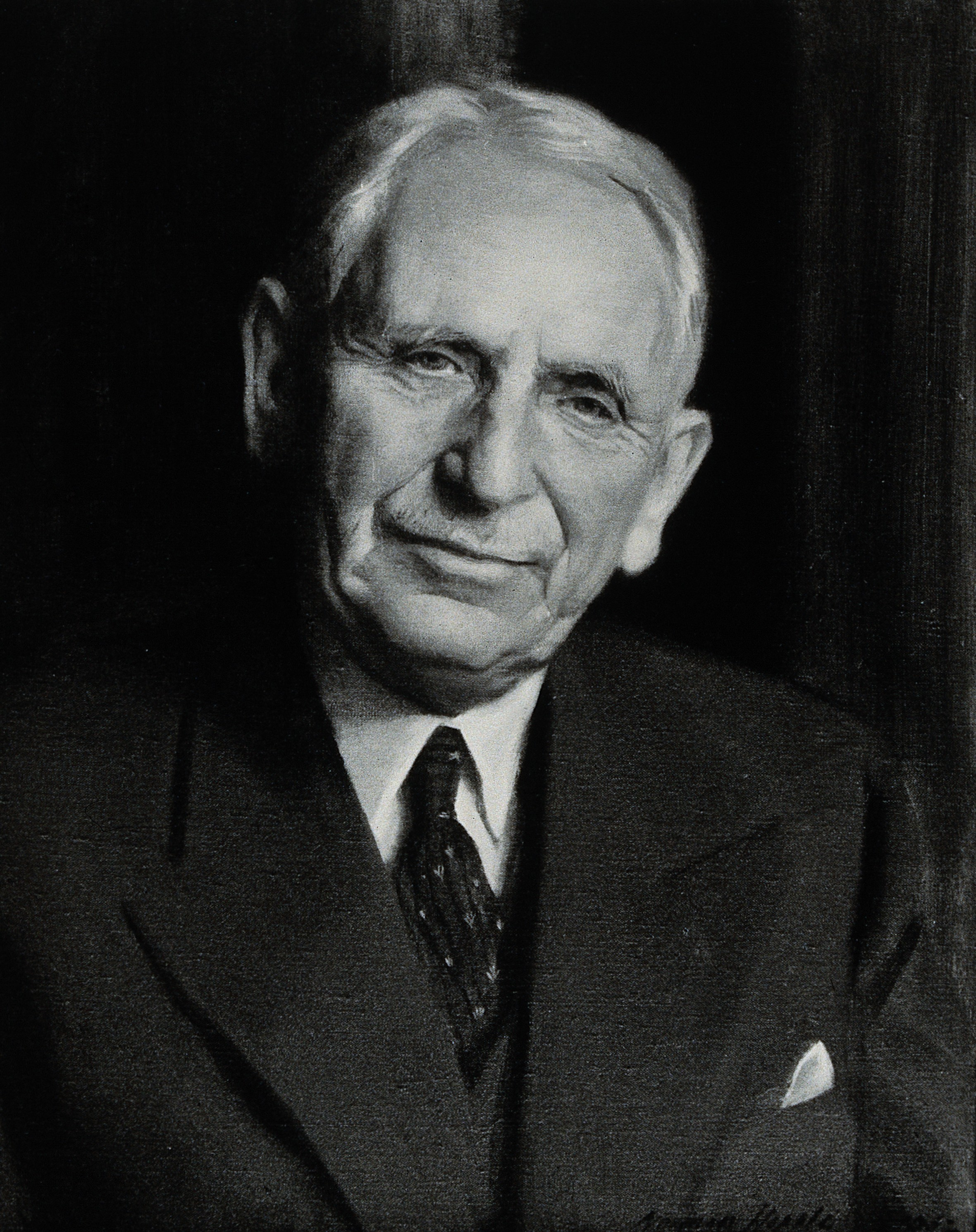

Director, Wellcome Laboratories of Tropical Medicine
- In office 1946–1955

Director of Pathology, War Office
- In office 1945–1946

Personal details
- Born: John Smith Knox Boyd; 18 September 1891 Largs, Ayrshire, Scotland
- Died: 10 June 1981 (aged 89)

Brigadier Sir John Smith Knox Boyd (18 September 1891 – 10 June 1981) was a Scottish bacteriologist and a senior officer in the Royal Army Medical Corps (RAMC).

== Biography ==
Boyd was born in Largs, Ayrshire, to John Knox Boyd, a bank agent, and his wife Margaret Wilson Smith, the younger Boyd attended Largs Academy before studying medicine at Glasgow University under Sir Robert Muir and Carl Browning. He came top in his year, securing the Brunton Medal, when he graduated MB ChB in 1913 (he subsequently secured the Diploma in Public Health (DPH) from Cambridge in 1924 and the Doctor of Medicine (MD) degree from Glasgow in 1948) and joined the RAMC the following year, serving in France, Belgium and Salonika in the First World War. He remained with the RAMC until 1946, also seeing action in the Second World War in the Middle East and North West Europe; for the year 1945–46, he was Director of Pathology at the War Office.

After retiring from the Army with the rank of Brigadier, he became Director of the Wellcome Laboratories of Tropical Medicine, remaining in office until 1955. He was knighted in 1958, appointed an Officer of the Order of the British Empire (OBE) in 1942, and a Fellow of the Royal Society and of the Royal College of Physicians in 1951. He received honorary doctorates from the universities of Salford and Glasgow and the Manson Medal in 1968.

He was married twice, firstly to Elizabeth Edgar from 1918 till her death in 1956, and secondly to Mary Murphy (daughter of D. H. Murphy) from 1957 until her death in 1968.

The bacteria Shigella boydii is named after him.
