= Kiyoshi Shiga =

Japanese physician (1871–1957)

- 志賀 潔
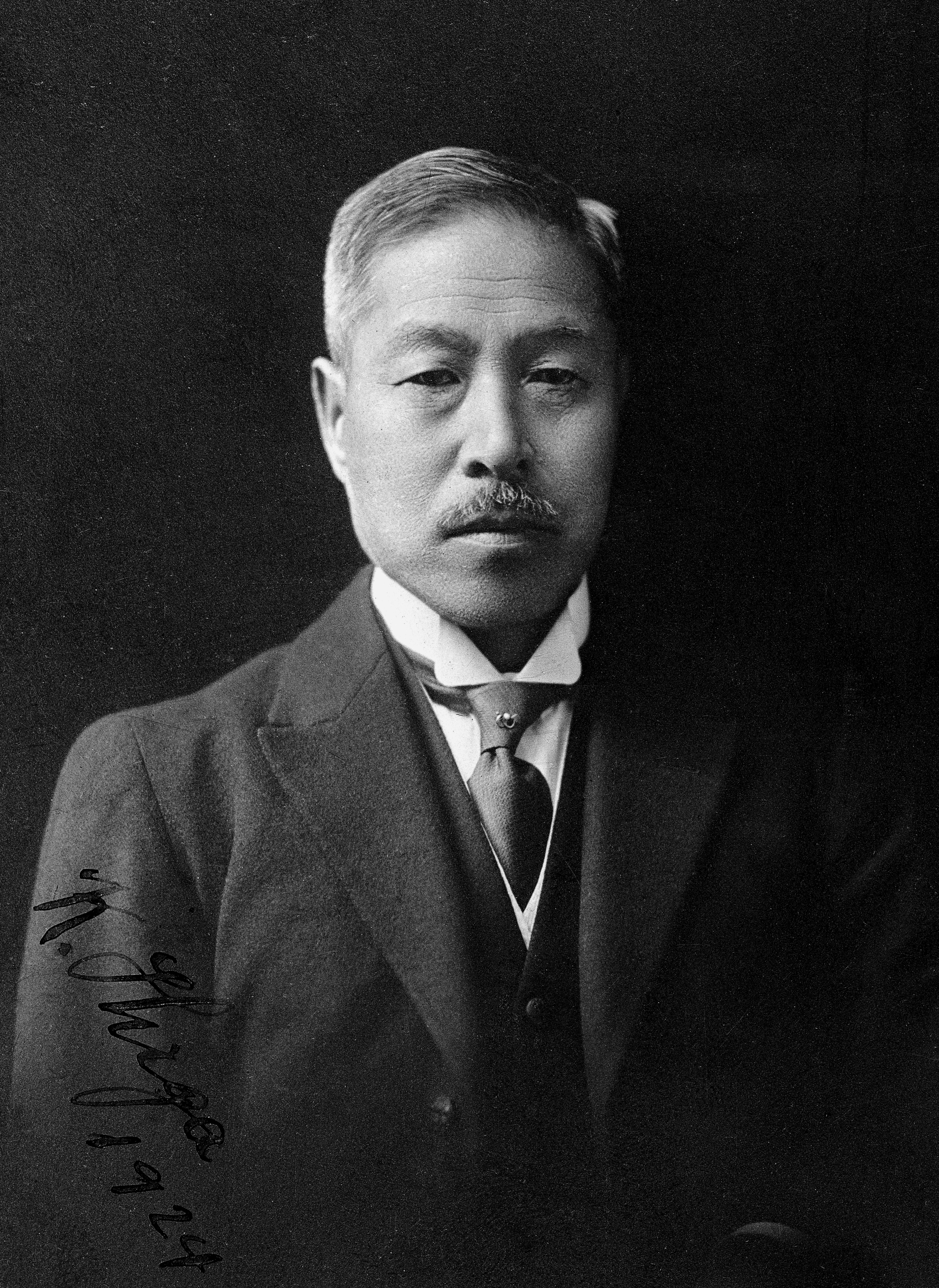
- Shiga in 1924
- Born: Kiyoshi Satō; February 7, 1871; Sendai, Miyagi, Japan
- Died: January 25, 1957 (aged 85); Sendai, Japan
- Education: Tokyo Imperial University
- Occupation: Medical Researcher
- Known for: Discovery of Shigella

Kiyoshi Shiga (志賀 潔, Shiga Kiyoshi; February 7, 1871 – January 25, 1957) was a Japanese physician and bacteriologist. He had a well-rounded education and career that led to many scientific discoveries. In 1897, Shiga was credited with the discovery and identification of the Shigella dysenteriae microorganism which causes dysentery, and the Shiga toxin which is produced by the bacteria. He conducted research on other diseases such as tuberculosis and trypanosomiasis, and made many advancements in bacteriology and immunology.

== Personal life ==
Shiga was born in Sendai, Miyagi Prefecture. His original surname was Satō, but he changed it to his mother's maiden name, Shiga, after being brought up by his maternal family. Shiga was raised during Japan's Industrial age and restoration. The changing times put financial troubles on his family. In 1900, Kiyoshi Shiga married Ichiko Shiga and in the following years had eight children. He faced many family hardships. Shiga lost his wife in 1944 to stomach cancer, his eldest son to turbulent seas during a voyage, and another son to tuberculosis.

== Career ==
Kiyoshi Shiga attended the Medical School of Tokyo Imperial University in 1896, after his high school studies. It was at the university when he was introduced to Kitasato Shibasaburō, one of Robert Koch's successors, who was a world-famous Japanese scientist studying the bacteriology and immunology of deadly disease at the time. Shiga's fascination with Kitasato and his work lead him to pursue a career at the Institute for the Study of Infectious Diseases directed by Kitasato Shibasaburō. While working for the institute, Shiga became famous for the discovery of Shigella dysenteriae, the organism that causes dysentery, in 1897, during a severe epidemic in which more than 90,000 cases were reported, with a mortality rate approaching 30%. The bacterium Shigella was thus named after him, as well as the Shiga toxin, which is produced by the bacterium. After the discovery of Shigella, Shiga worked with Paul Ehrlich in Germany from 1901 to 1905. When he returned to Japan, he resumed the study of infectious diseases with Kitasato. Shiga became a professor at Keio University in 1920. From 1929 to 1931, Shiga was the president of Keijō Imperial University in Keijo (Seoul) and was senior medical advisor to the Japanese Governor-General of Korea. Shiga was a recipient of the Order of Culture in 1944. He was also awarded the Order of the Sacred Treasure, 1st class, on his death in 1957. Along with many of his accomplishments, Shiga had written textbooks on bacteriology and immunology that were widely popular, even after his death in 1957.

== Discovery of Shigella dysenteriae ==
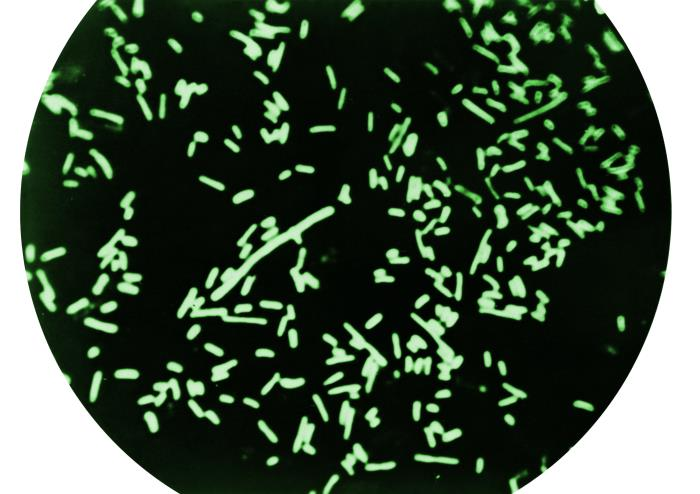
Dark field microscopy of a Shigella dysenteriae culture.

After graduating from the Tokyo Imperial University school of medicine, Kiyoshi Shiga began his career as an assistant to Kitasato Shibasaburō at the Institute for the Study of Infectious Diseases. While studying many infamous diseases at the time, Kitasato and his colleagues, including Shiga, turned their focus to discovering the microorganism that caused the dysentery outbreak in 1897. In 1898, Shiga was able to isolate and identify the microorganism causing the infectious disease by studying patients who had dysentery and following Koch's Postulates. Using gram staining methods, Shiga was able to further deduce that the microorganism causing dysentery was a gram-negative bacillus. Kiyoshi Shiga initially called the bacteria Bacillus dysenteriae, but the name was later changed to Shigella dysenteriae as a tribute to Kiyoshi Shiga. The discovery of the gram-negative bacillus led to the identification of other species of bacteria with similar characteristic. These species of bacteria are classified under the Shigella genus. Species of Shigella are further separated by serogroups that represent different serotypes. Through further studies of the S. dysenteriae bacteria, Shiga was able to discover the Shiga toxin that is produced by the organism. With this new discovery, Shiga attempted to make a vaccine from the toxin. He tested his first attempt, a heat-killed S. dysenteriae strain vaccine, on himself which proved to be ineffective and caused severe complications. Kiyoshi Shiga continued his efforts and created a passive immunization vaccine that was based on horse serum. Test trials for the passive immunization vaccine showed no beneficial results or immunity to the infection. These setbacks led Shiga to stop any further trials or production of a Shiga toxin-based vaccine.

== Research ==
Shiga had done research on other topics aside from Shigella dysenteriae including tuberculosis, leprosy, and beriberi throughout his career and grew an interest in chemotherapy and immunology. After the Shigella dysenteriae discovery, Kiyoshi Shiga worked with Paul Ehrlich in Europe on discovering chemotherapy methods for a blood diseases called trypanosomiasis which was caused by a protozoan microorganism. Paul Ehrlich is known for his work with dyes and their ability to distinguish and kill certain bacteria and tissues. Ehrlich's previous research, before working with Shiga, lead to the discovery of chemotherapy. Shiga and Ehrlich's research into chemotherapy dyes lead them to the discovery of trypan red, a drug that was proven to have an effect on trypanosomiasis. In 1905, after the discovery of trypan red, Shiga returned to Japan with an international reputation and continued his work at Kitasato's laboratory.

Kiyoshi Shiga also played a role in the development of the BCG vaccine for tuberculosis. In 1924, Shiga delivered a strain of tuberculosis called BCG Tokyo 172 strain from Paris, France to Japan. It was his transportation of the samples that lead scientist to culture and produce a vaccine and tuberculin to fight the disease. Shiga was a supporter of vaccines, but also an advocate for public health prevention and awareness. He participated in many Chinese writings about the education and prevention of diseases such as tuberculosis.

== Bibliography ==
- Csuros, Maria. Microbiological Examination of Water and Wastewater. CRC Press (1999). ISBN 1-56670-179-1
- Kleinman. Pediatric Gastrointestinal Disease (2008). ISBN 1-55009-364-9
