= Eggerthia =

Scientific classification
- Domain: Bacteria
- Kingdom: Bacillati
- Phylum: Bacillota
- Class: Erysipelotrichia
- Order: Erysipelotrichales
- Family: Coprobacillaceae
- Genus: Eggerthia; Salvetti et al. 2011

Type species
- Eggerthia catenaformis (Eggerth 1935) Salvetti et al. 2011

Species
- Eggerthia catenaformis

Synonyms
- "Catenabacterium" Prévot 1938

Genus of bacteria

Eggerthia is a genus from the family Coprobacillaceae, with one known species (Eggerthia catenaformis).
