= Catenibacterium =

Scientific classification
- Domain: Bacteria
- Kingdom: Bacillati
- Phylum: Bacillota
- Class: Erysipelotrichia
- Order: Erysipelotrichales
- Family: Coprobacillaceae
- Genus: Catenibacterium; Kageyama and Benno 2000

Type species
- Catenibacterium mitsuokai Kageyama & Benno 2000

Species
- "C. faecis"; C. mitsuokai; "C. tridentinum"

Genus of bacteria

Catenibacterium is a Gram-positive, non-spore-forming and anaerobic genus from the family Erysipelotrichidae, with one known species (Catenibacterium mitsuokai).

== Phylogeny ==
The currently accepted taxonomy is based on the List of Prokaryotic names with Standing in Nomenclature (LPSN) and National Center for Biotechnology Information (NCBI).

16S rRNA based LTP_10_2024

- Catenibacterium
  C. mitsuokai

120 marker proteins based GTDB 09-RS220

- Catenibacterium
  - "C. faecis" Liu et al. 2021
  - C. mitsuokai Kageyama & Benno 2000

== See also ==
- List of bacterial orders
- List of bacteria genera
