= Enteroinvasive Escherichia coli =

- Specialty: Infectious diseases

Enteroinvasive Escherichia coli (EIEC) is a type of pathogenic bacteria whose infection causes a syndrome that is identical to shigellosis, with profuse diarrhea and high fever. EIEC are highly invasive, and they use adhesin proteins to bind to and enter intestinal cells. They produce no toxins, but severely damage the intestinal wall through mechanical cell destruction.

EIEC are closely related to Shigella, like all E. coli are. Their similarity in disease phenotype come from a homologous large virulence plasmid pINV. They also have in common in their loss of cadaverine synthesis, of ompT, and of curli formation. These features are probably acquired independently, as the two lost cadaverine synthesis in different ways. Moreover, the "EIEC" does not form a monophyletic group in E. coli.

After the E. coli strain penetrates through the epithelial wall, the endocytosis vacuole gets lysed, the strain multiplies using the host cell machinery, and extends to the adjacent epithelial cell. In addition, the plasmid of the strain carries genes for a type III secretion system that is used as the virulent factor. Although it is an invasive disease, the invasion usually does not pass the submucosal layer. The similar pathology to shigellosis may be because both strains of bacteria share some virulent factors. The invasion of the cells can trigger a mild form of diarrhea or dysentery, often mistaken for dysentery caused by Shigella species. The illness is characterized by the appearance of blood and mucus in the stools of infected individuals or a condition called colitis.

Dysentery caused by EIEC usually occurs within 12 to 72 hours following the ingestion of contaminated food. The illness is characterized by abdominal cramps, diarrhea, vomiting, fever, chills, and a generalized malaise. Dysentery caused by this organism is generally self-limiting with no known complications.

It is currently unknown what foods may harbor EIEC, but any food contaminated with human feces from an ill individual, either directly or via contaminated water, could cause disease in others. Outbreaks have been associated with hamburger meat and unpasteurized milk.

Enterovirulent classes of E. coli are referred to as the EEC group (enterovirulent E. coli):

1. Enteroinvasive E. coli (EIEC) invades (passes into) the intestinal wall to produce severe diarrhea.
2. Enterohemorrhagic E. coli (EHEC): A type of EHEC, E. coli O157:H7, can cause bloody diarrhea and hemolytic uremic syndrome (anemia and kidney failure).
3. Enterotoxigenic E. coli (ETEC) produces a toxin that acts on the intestinal lining, and is the most common cause of traveler's diarrhea.
4. Enteropathogenic E. coli (EPEC) can cause diarrhea outbreaks in newborn nurseries.
5. Enteroaggregative E. coli (EAggEC) can cause acute and chronic (long-lasting) diarrhea in children.

== See also ==
- Sereny test
