= Bacteriology =

Subdiscipline of microbiology that studies bacteria

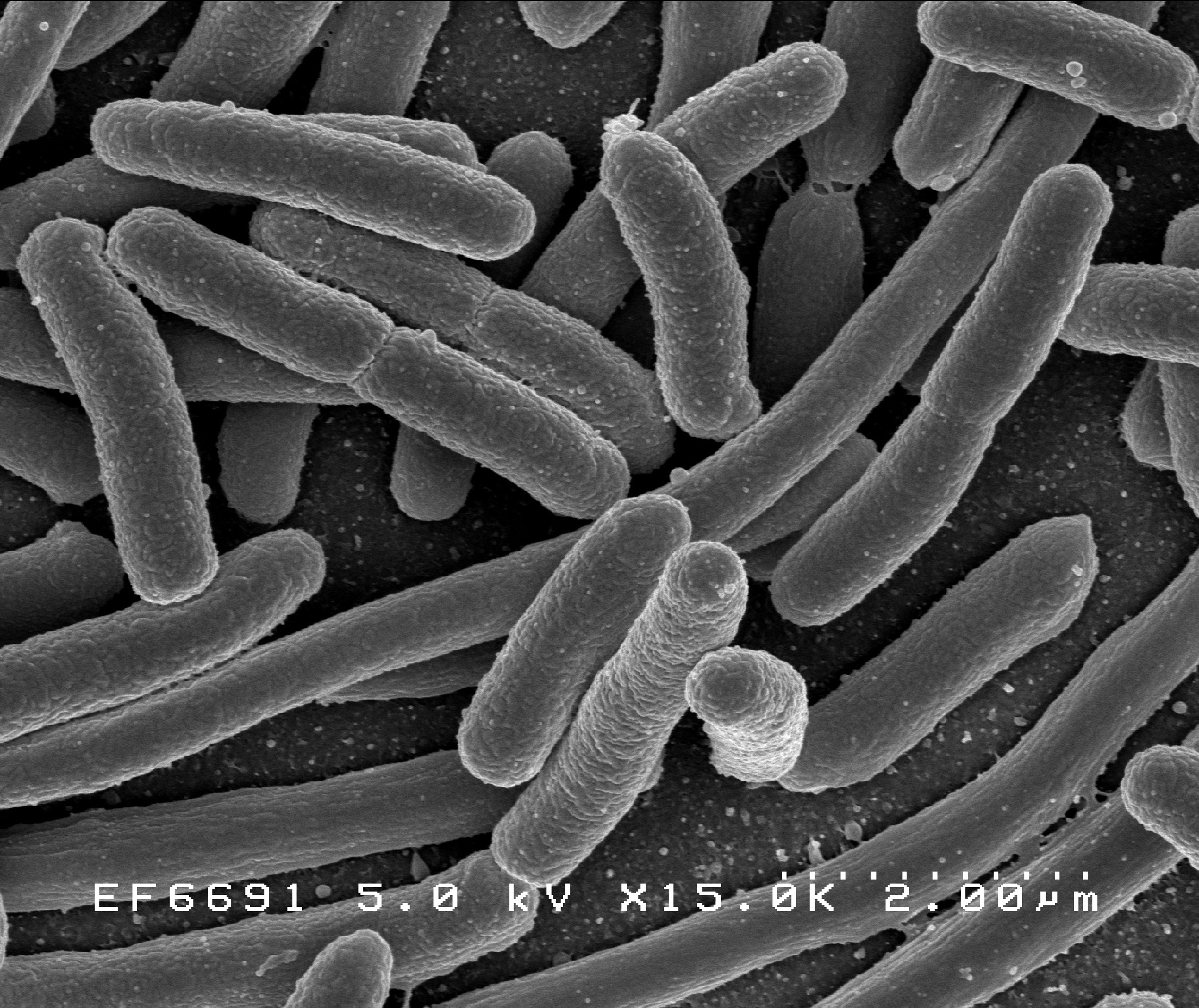
Scanning electron micrograph of Escherichia coli, a common human pathogen and research organism.

Bacteriology is the branch and specialty of biology that studies the morphology, ecology, genetics and biochemistry of bacteria as well as many other aspects related to them. This subdivision of microbiology involves the identification, classification, and characterization of bacterial species. Because of the similarity of thinking and working with microorganisms other than bacteria, such as protozoa, fungi, and non-microorganism viruses, there has been a tendency for the field of bacteriology to extend as microbiology. The terms were formerly often used interchangeably. However, bacteriology can be classified as a distinct science.

== Overview ==
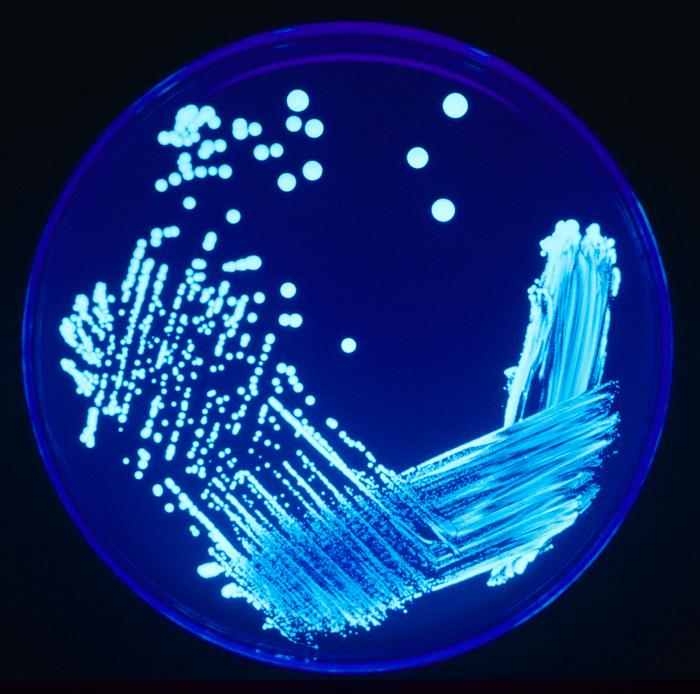
An agar plate with bacteria spread by the streak plate method.

=== Definition ===
Bacteriology is the study of bacteria. Bacteriology evolved from physicians needing to apply the germ theory to address the concerns relating to disease spreading in hospitals the 19th century. Identification and characterizing of bacteria being associated to diseases led to advances in pathogenic bacteriology. Koch's postulates played a role into identifying the relationships between bacteria and specific diseases. Since then, bacteriology has played a role in successful advances in science such as bacterial vaccines like diphtheria toxoid and tetanus toxoid. Bacteriology can be studied and applied in many sub-fields relating to agriculture, marine biology, water pollution, bacterial genetics, veterinary medicine, biotechnology and others.

=== Bacteriologists ===
A bacteriologist is a microbiologist or other trained professional in bacteriology. Bacteriologists are interested in studying and learning about bacteria, as well as using their skills in clinical settings. This includes investigating properties of bacteria such as morphology, ecology, genetics and biochemistry, phylogenetics, genomics and many other areas related to bacteria like disease diagnostic testing. They can also work as medical scientists, veterinary scientists, or diagnostic technicians in locations like clinics, blood banks, hospitals, laboratories and animal hospitals. Bacteriologists working in public health or biomedical research help develop vaccines for public use.

== Culturing bacteria ==
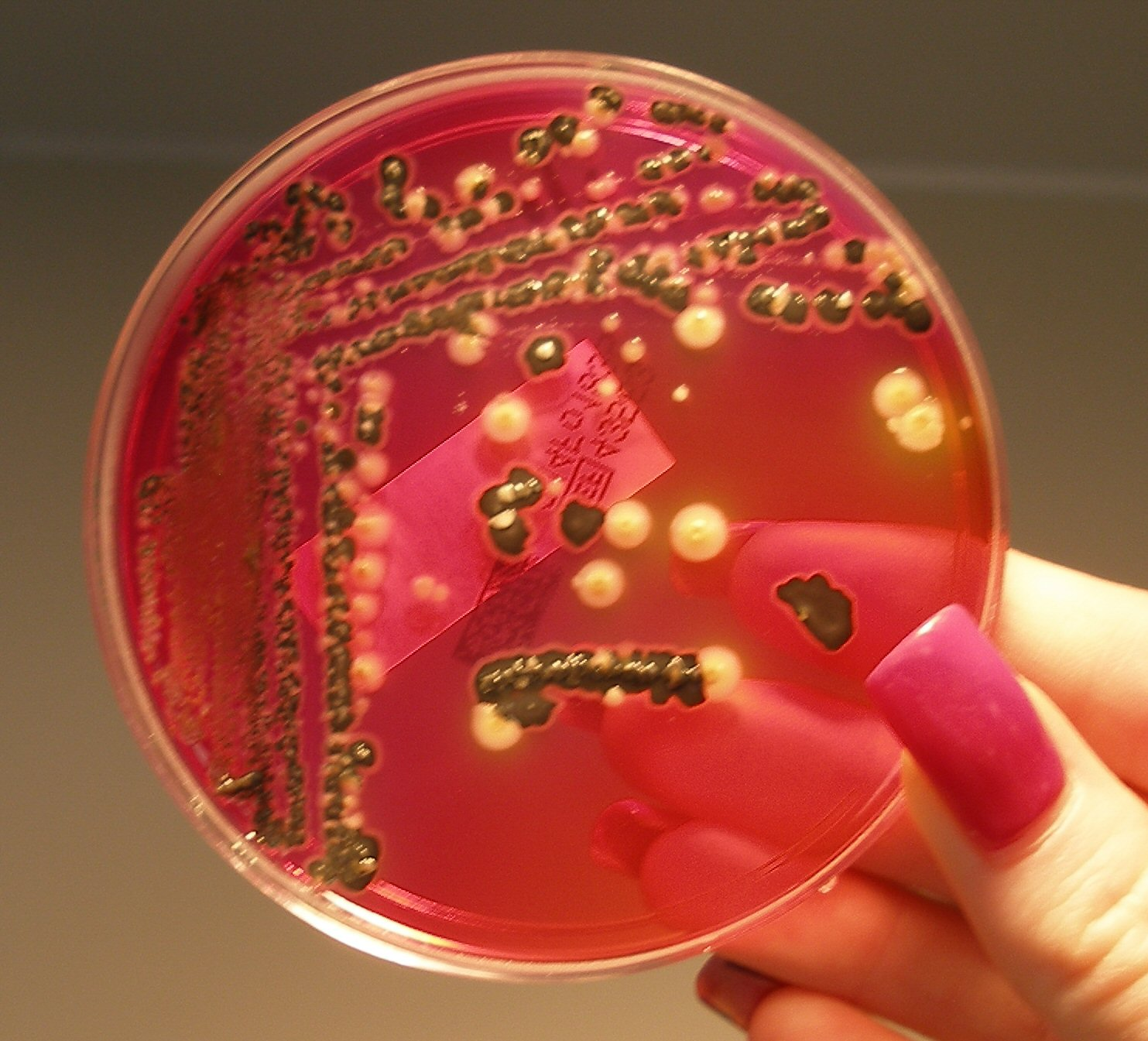
Salmonella growing on XLD agar

The growth of bacteria in laboratory cultures is the mainstay method used by bacteriologists. Both solid and liquid culture media are used. Solid culture medium is usually nutrient agar in a petri dish. The constituents of the nutrient agar vary according to the bacteria under investigation. For growing the bacterium Haemophilus influenzae, for example, which is dependent on hemin and nicotinamide adenine dinucleotide for its growth, blood (usually from a sheep or a horse) is added to the medium. When growing bacteria that are found in the intestines of mammals, such as salmonella, XLD agar which contains, among other ingredients deoxycholic acid is used.

== History ==
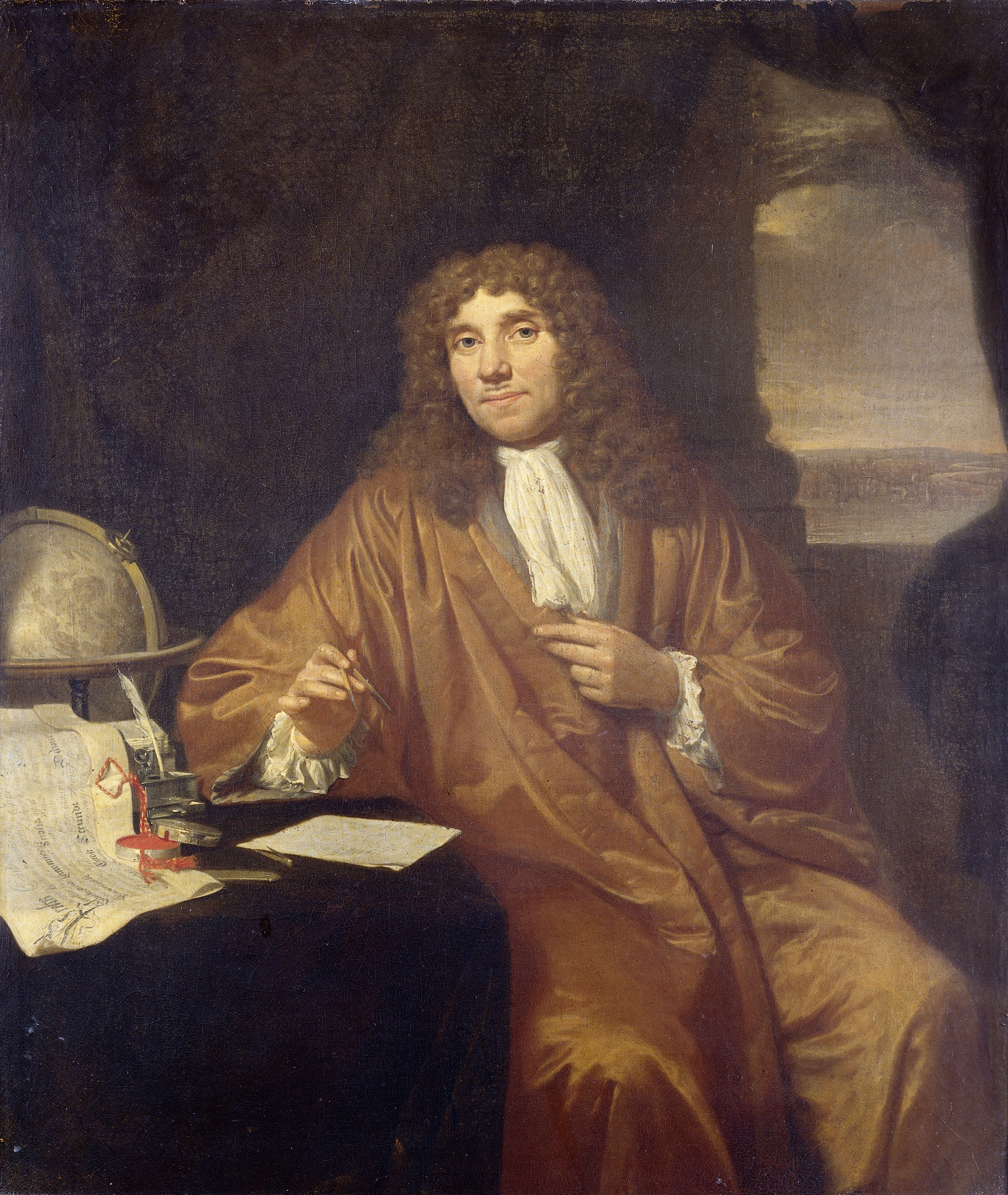
Antonie van Leeuwenhoek, the first person to observe bacteria using a microscope.

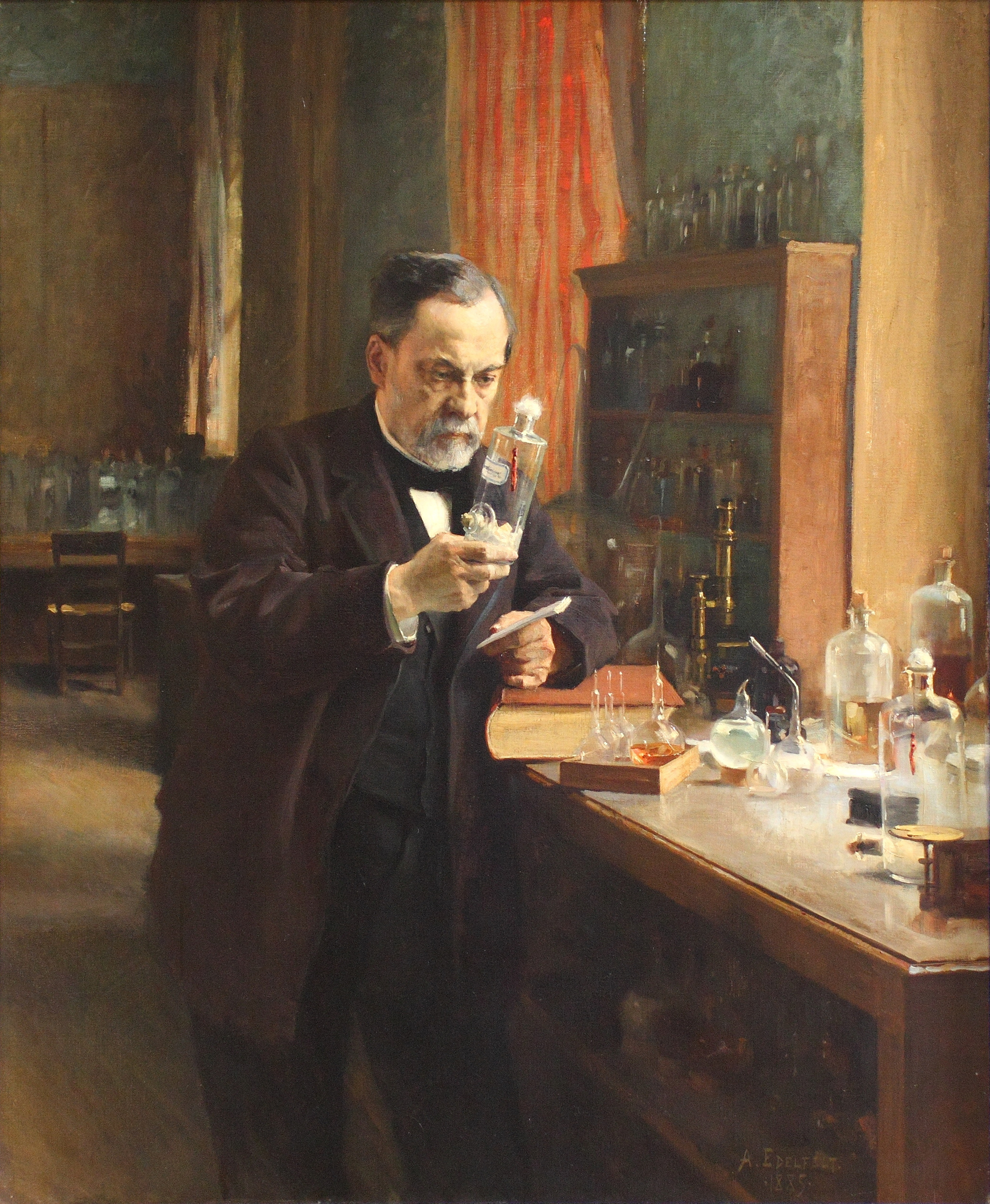
Louis Pasteur in his laboratory, painting by A. Edelfeldt in 1885

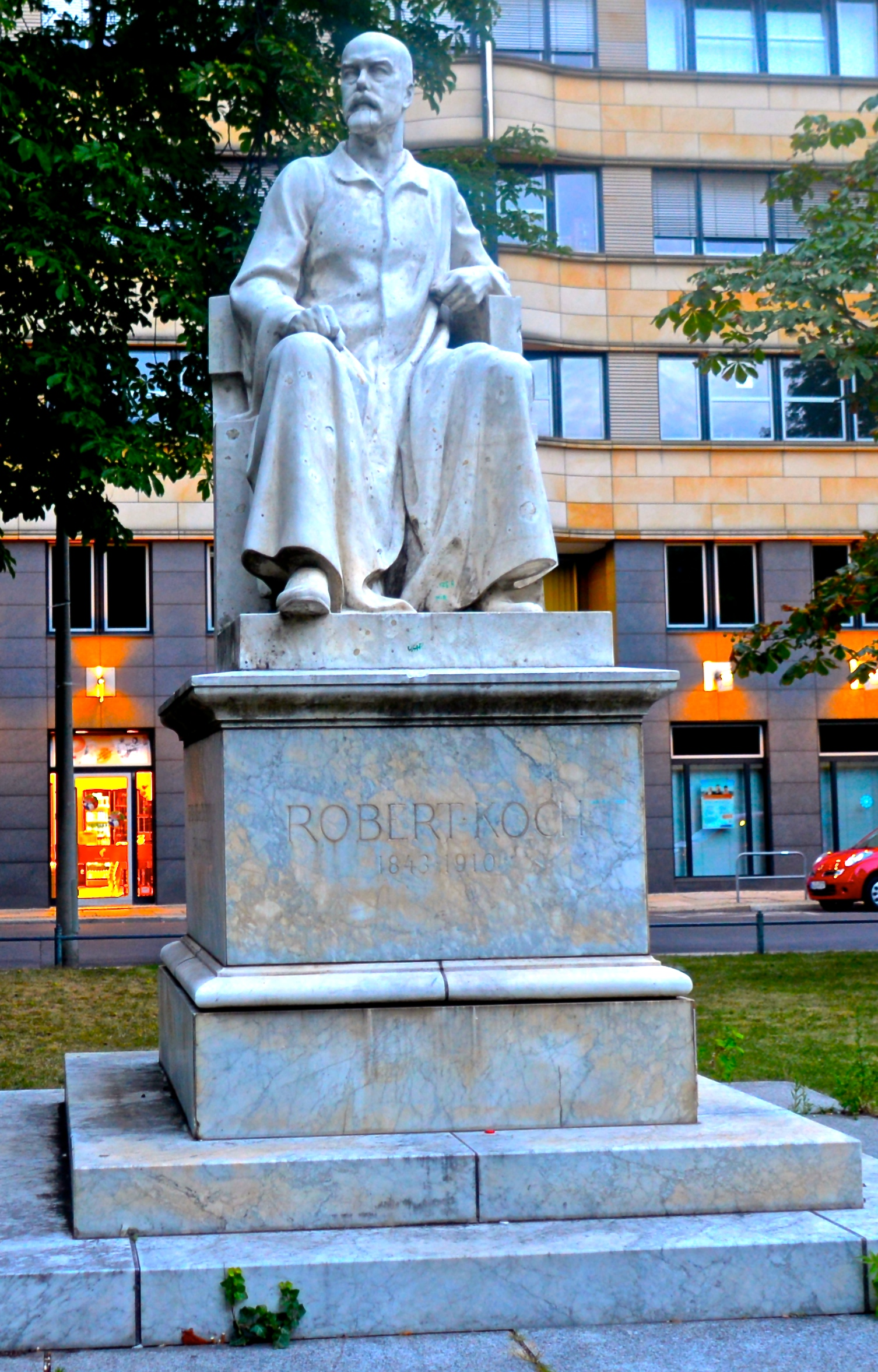
Statue of Robert Koch in Berlin

Bacteria were first observed by the Dutch microscopist Antonie van Leeuwenhoek in 1676, using a single-lens microscope of his own design. Leeuwenhoek did not recognize bacteria as a distinct category of microorganisms, and referred to all microorganisms, including bacteria, protists, and microscopic animals, as animalcules. He published his observations in a series of letters to the Royal Society of London. His observations also included protozoans. The German Ferdinand Cohn began studying bacteria in 1870 and is also said to be a founder of bacteriology, as he was the first to classify bacteria into groups based on their cell shapes. He defined bacteria as "chlorophyll-free cells of spherical, oblong, or cylindrical form, sometimes twisted or bent, which multiply exclusively by transverse division and occur either isolated or in cell families," and placed them in the plant kingdom. He also discovered heat-resistant bacterial endospores

Louis Pasteur demonstrated in 1859 that microorganisms cause the fermentation process, and that this growth is not due to spontaneous generation (yeasts and molds, commonly associated with fermentation, are not bacteria, but rather fungi). Along with his contemporary Robert Koch, Pasteur was an early advocate of the germ theory of disease. Between 1880 and 1881 Pasteur produced two successful vaccinations for animals against diseases caused by bacteria. The importance of bacteria was recognized as it led to a study of disease prevention and treatment of diseases by vaccines. Pasteur's research led to Ignaz Semmelweis and Joseph Lister researching the importance of sanitized hands in medical work.

In the 1840s, Semmelweis' observations and ideas surrounding sanitary techniques were rejected and his book on the topic condemned by the medical community due to its conflict with the prevailing theory and practice of humorism at the time. After Lister's publications, which supported hand washing and sanitation with germ theory, doctors started sanitizing their hands in the 1870s; mandatory handwashing was not incorporated into common health practice until as late as the 1980s.

The discovery of the connection of microorganisms to disease came later in the nineteenth century, when Italian anatomist Filippo Pacini isolated the cholera bacterium Vibrio cholerae in 1854 in Florence during the Asiatic Cholera Pandemic of 1846–63 and clearly linked the presence of the bacterium in the intestinal mucosa of dead cholera patients to the disease. Although Pacini's work was available to the international scientific community via French and English translations, the discovery of the cholera-causing agent is often attributed to the German physician Robert Koch who rediscovered it in 1884. Koch is credited for introducing the science of microorganisms including bacteria to the medical field. Koch, a pioneer in medical microbiology, worked on cholera, anthrax and tuberculosis. In his research into tuberculosis Koch finally proved the germ theory, for which he received a Nobel Prize in 1905. In Koch's postulates, he set out criteria to test if an organism is the cause of a disease, and these postulates are still used today. Both Koch and Pasteur played a role in improving antisepsis in medical treatment. In 1870–1885 the modern methods of bacteriology technique were introduced by the use of stains, and by the method of separating mixtures of organisms on plates of nutrient media.

Though it had been known since the nineteenth century that bacteria are a cause of many diseases, no effective antibacterial treatments were available until the 20th century. In 1910, Paul Ehrlich developed the first antibiotic, by changing dyes that selectively stained Treponema pallidum—the spirochaete that causes syphilis—into compounds that selectively killed the pathogen. Ehrlich was awarded a 1908 Nobel Prize for his work on immunology, and pioneered the use of stains to detect and identify bacteria, with his work being the basis of the Gram stain and the Ziehl–Neelsen stain.

In the early 20th century, there was debate about the classification of bacteria. In 1904, cyanobacteria were usually classified as a class of algae, which are eukaryotic. However, Haeckel at this time classed cyanobacteria with bacteria because they lacked nuclei. In 1938, Herbert Faulkner Copeland proposed that prokaryotes be granted their own kingdom. The development of the transmission electron microscope allowed better visualization of cell structure and helped to clarify issues. In 1962, Stanier and van Niel published an influential definition of bacteria, proposing that bacteria be defined as prokaryotic cellular entities; they also specified three differences between prokaryotes and eukaryotes: presence or absence of internal membranes, division by fission or mitosis, and presence or absence of a cell wall.

A major step forward in the study of bacteria came in 1977 when Carl Woese recognised that archaea have a separate line of evolutionary descent from bacteria. This new phylogenetic taxonomy came from the sequencing of 16S ribosomal RNA and divided prokaryotes into two evolutionary domains as part of the three-domain system.

== Further reading. ==
- Mendelsohn, John Andrew. "Cultures of bacteriology: Formation and transformation of a science in France and Germany, 1870-1914" (PhD dissertation, Princeton University' ProQuest Dissertations & Theses, 1996. 9701218).
