= Apocholate citrate agar =

Apocholate citrate agar (ACA) is a selective environment used to isolate Shigella and Salmonella bacteria. The name derives from apocholate and citrate in agar.
