= Apocholic acid =

Names
- IUPAC name 3α,12α-Dihydroxy-5β-chol-8(14)-en-24-oic acid
- Systematic IUPAC name (4R)-4-[(1R,5aR,7R,9aS,9bR,11S,11aR)-7,11-Dihydroxy-9a,11a-dimethyl-2,3,4,5,5a,6,7,8,9,9a,9b,10,11,11a-tetradecahydro-1H-cyclopenta[a]phenanthren-1-yl]pentanoic acid
- Other names 3α,12α-Dihydroxy-5β,8(14)-cholen-24-oic acid; 5β,8(14)-Cholen-24-oic acid-3α,12α-diol

Identifiers
CAS Number	641-81-6; 63949-02-0 (sodium apocholate)
3D model (JSmol)	Interactive image
ChemSpider	91993
PubChem CID	101818
UNII	MZW7515V5Z; U2L03X5GY0 (sodium apocholate)
CompTox Dashboard (EPA)	DTXSID00214307
- InChI: InChI=1S/C24H38O4/c1-14(4-9-22(27)28)18-7-8-19-17-6-5-15-12-16(25)10-11-23(15,2)20(17)13-21(26)24(18,19)3/h14-16,18,20-21,25-26H,4-13H2,1-3H3,(H,27,28)/t14-,15-,16-,18-,20+,21+,23+,24-/m1/s1 Key: XWJTYEGVQBFZHI-IMPNNSMHSA-N
- SMILES: C[C@H](CCC(O)=O)[C@@]1([H])CCC2=C3CC[C@]4([H])C[C@H](O)CC[C@]4(C)C3C[C@H](O)[C@@]21C

Properties
Chemical formula	C_{24}H_{38}O_{4}
Molar mass	390.564 g·mol^{−1}
Melting point	175 to 176 °C (347 to 349 °F; 448 to 449 K)
- Except where otherwise noted, data are given for materials in their standard state (at 25 °C [77 °F], 100 kPa). verify (what is ?) Infobox references

Apocholic acid is an unsaturated bile acid first characterized in the 1920s. It has questionable carcinogenic activity as experimentally, sarcomas were induced in mice with injection of deoxycholic acid.

The salts and esters of apocholic acid are known as apocholates.

Structure of sodium apocholate

== See also ==
- Apocholate citrate agar
