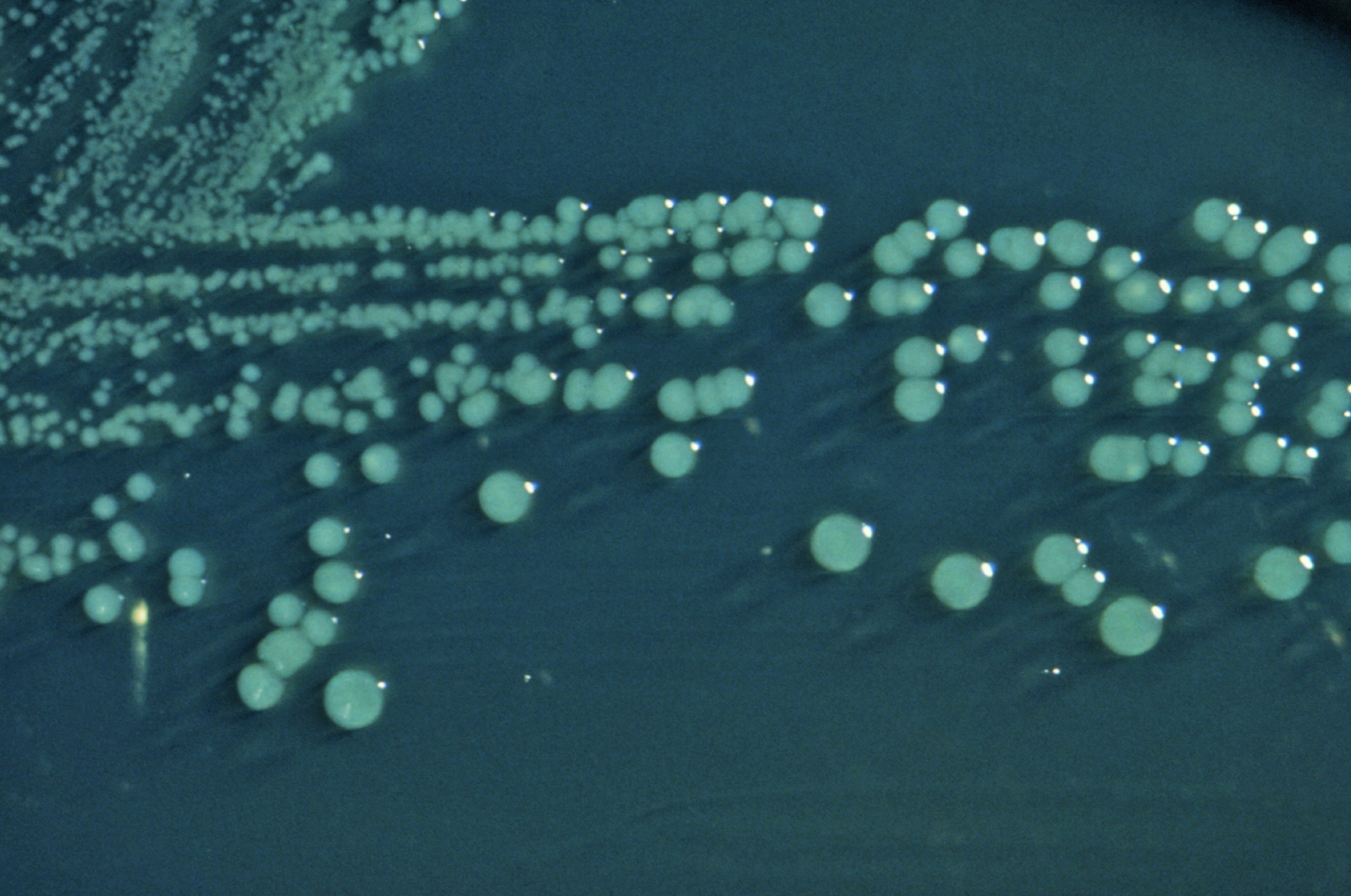
- Shigella boydii on Hektoen enteric agar

Scientific classification
- Domain: Bacteria
- Kingdom: Pseudomonadati
- Phylum: Pseudomonadota
- Class: Gammaproteobacteria
- Order: Enterobacterales
- Family: Enterobacteriaceae
- Genus: Shigella
- Species: S. boydii

Binomial name
- Shigella boydii Ewing 1949

= Shigella boydii =

Species of bacterium

Shigella boydii is a Gram-negative bacterium of the genus Shigella. Like other members of the genus, S. boydii is a nonmotile, nonsporeforming, rod-shaped bacterium which can cause dysentery in humans through fecal-oral contamination.

Shigella boydii is the most genetically divergent species of the genus Shigella. There are 19 known serotypes of Shigella boydii. S. boydii is restricted to the Indian subcontinent.

The species is named after the British bacteriologist John Boyd.

== Sequenced genomes ==
- Shigella boydii strain BS512 (serotype 18; group 1) has one chromosome and five plasmids.
