= DCA agar =

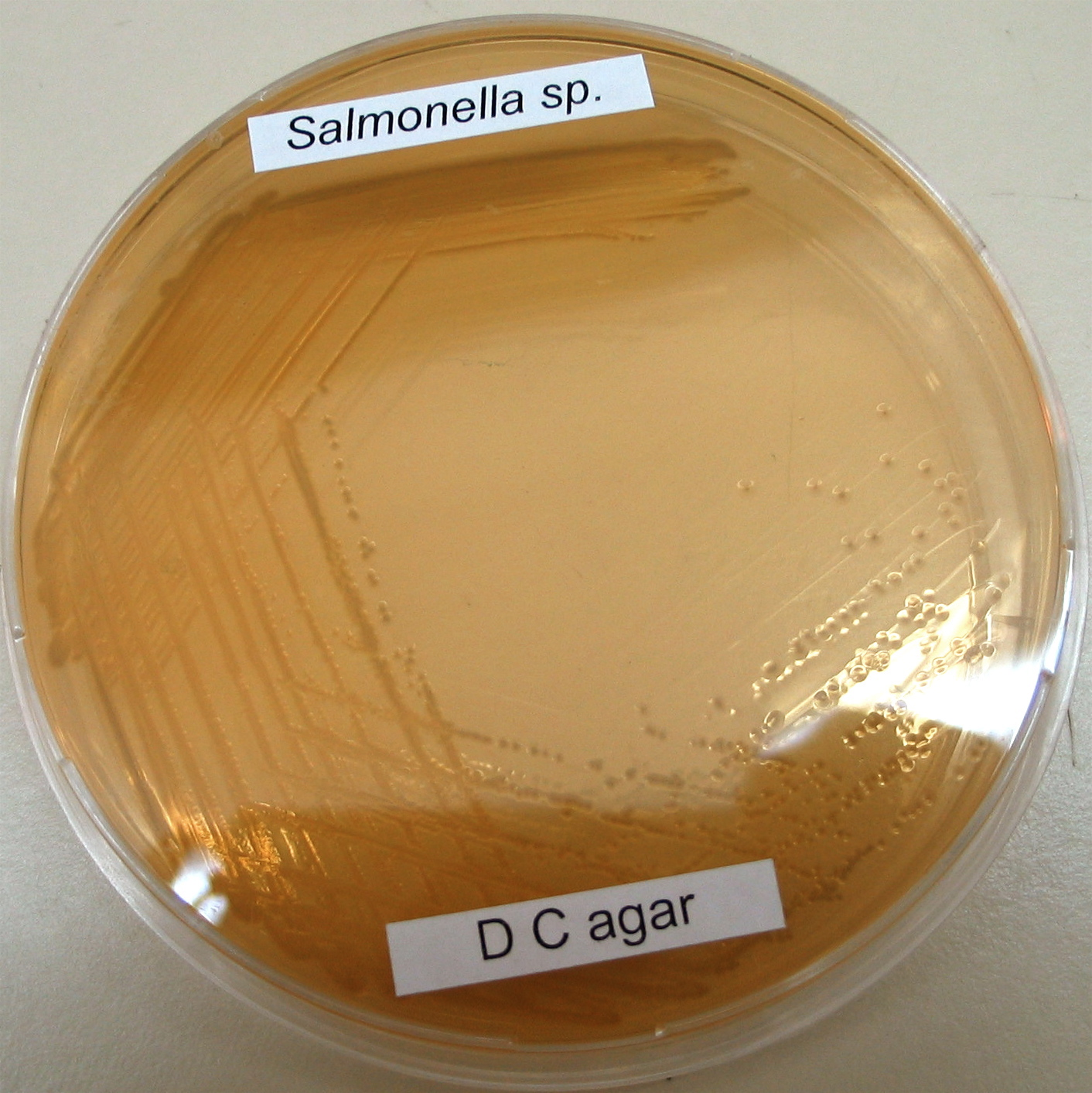
A microbiological culture of Salmonella sp. bacteria on DC agar culture medium

DCA agar (deoxycholate citrate agar) is a solid bacteriological growth medium used for isolation of enteric pathogens.

== Uses ==
It is particularly useful for the isolation of organisms that cause bacillary dysentery, salmonella strains that cause food poisoning and Salmonella Paratyphi. It is not so selective for Salmonella Typhi. This growth medium is inhibitory to most gut bacteria, in particular species of the genus Proteus, although these species do survive on DCA agar. It is therefore essential that suspected pathogens must be subcultured on a less inhibitory medium prior to identification. Salmonella spp appear to be yellow or colourless colonies, often with a dark centre. As there are many bacteria that also look like Salmonella on DCA, it is widely recommended that more selective agars are used for the identification of Salmonella, namely xylose lysine deoxycholate (XLD) agar. This growth medium is heat-sensitive and should be poured and cooled as soon as possible after addition of the deoxycholate, otherwise it tends to become very soft and difficult to handle. It has a pH of approximately 7.3, and when poured and cooled, appears light to dark pink in colour.

== Contents ==
One liter of deoxycholate citrate agar contains:

Sodium citrate	20 grams
Agar	17 grams
Lactose	10 grams
Solids from meat infusion	10 grams
Peptic digest of animal tissue	10 grams
Sodium deoxycholate	5 grams
Ferric citrate	1 gram
Neutral red	20 milligrams
