= Hektoen enteric agar =

Selective and differential agar

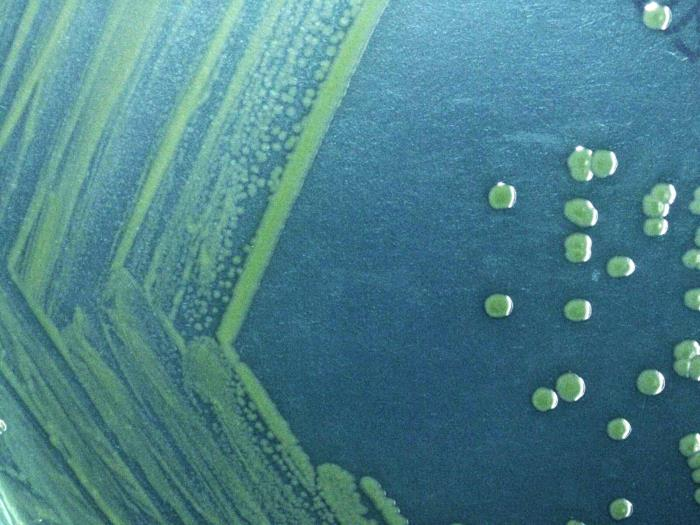
- Gram negative Shigella sonnei bacteria which spent 48 hours cultured on Hektoen enteric agar (HEK).
- Acronym: HEK, HE, or HEA
- Inventor: Hektoen Institute
- Manufacturer: Hektoen Institute

Hektoen enteric agar (HEK, HE or HEA) is a selective and differential agar primarily used to recover Salmonella and Shigella from patient specimens. HEA contains indicators of lactose fermentation and hydrogen sulfide production; as well as inhibitors to prevent the growth of Gram-positive bacteria. It is named after the Hektoen Institute in Chicago, where researchers developed the agar.

== Use ==
The definitive use of HEA is to discriminate between Shigella and Salmonella, although many other species may grow on these plates. However, while the other bacteria may be clinically relevant, the assay does not discriminate among them. Effectively, HEA uses a metabolic assay to divide colonies into "Salmonella and Shigella" and "everything else". Use of these plates assumes that the user is not interested in other enteric pathogens such as Klebsiella or Escherichia.

The plates contain various sugar sources (lactose, sucrose, and salicin), none of which can be used by either Shigella or Salmonella. However, the medium also includes peptone which can be used as a carbon source. Since most bacteria can use the sugars in preference to peptone, these "uninteresting" bacteria acidify the medium and turn a pH indicator yellow or red. Peptone metabolism by Shigella and Salmonella alkalises the medium, turning a pH indicator blue.

The presence of thiosulfate or ferric ammonium citrate in the medium produces a black precipitate in the presence of H_{2}S, allowing Shigella – which does not produce H_{2}S, and appears as green colonies – to be distinguished from Salmonella – which does produce hydrogen sulfide and appears as black colonies.

Few sulfur-reducing bacteria exist other than Salmonella, which can be isolated from the intestines. Most of these are inhibited on HEA plates by the inclusion of bile salts, so encountering a black colony that is not Salmonella is unusual, although not unheard of. Those that are may be identified as red or yellow colonies with a black centre, indicating that they are fermenting sugar and probably not Salmonella. However, rare strains of Salmonella are capable of lactose fermentation, which will appear in the same way.

== See also ==
- Agar plate
- Microbiology
