= MRS agar =

Selective culture medium for Lactobacilli

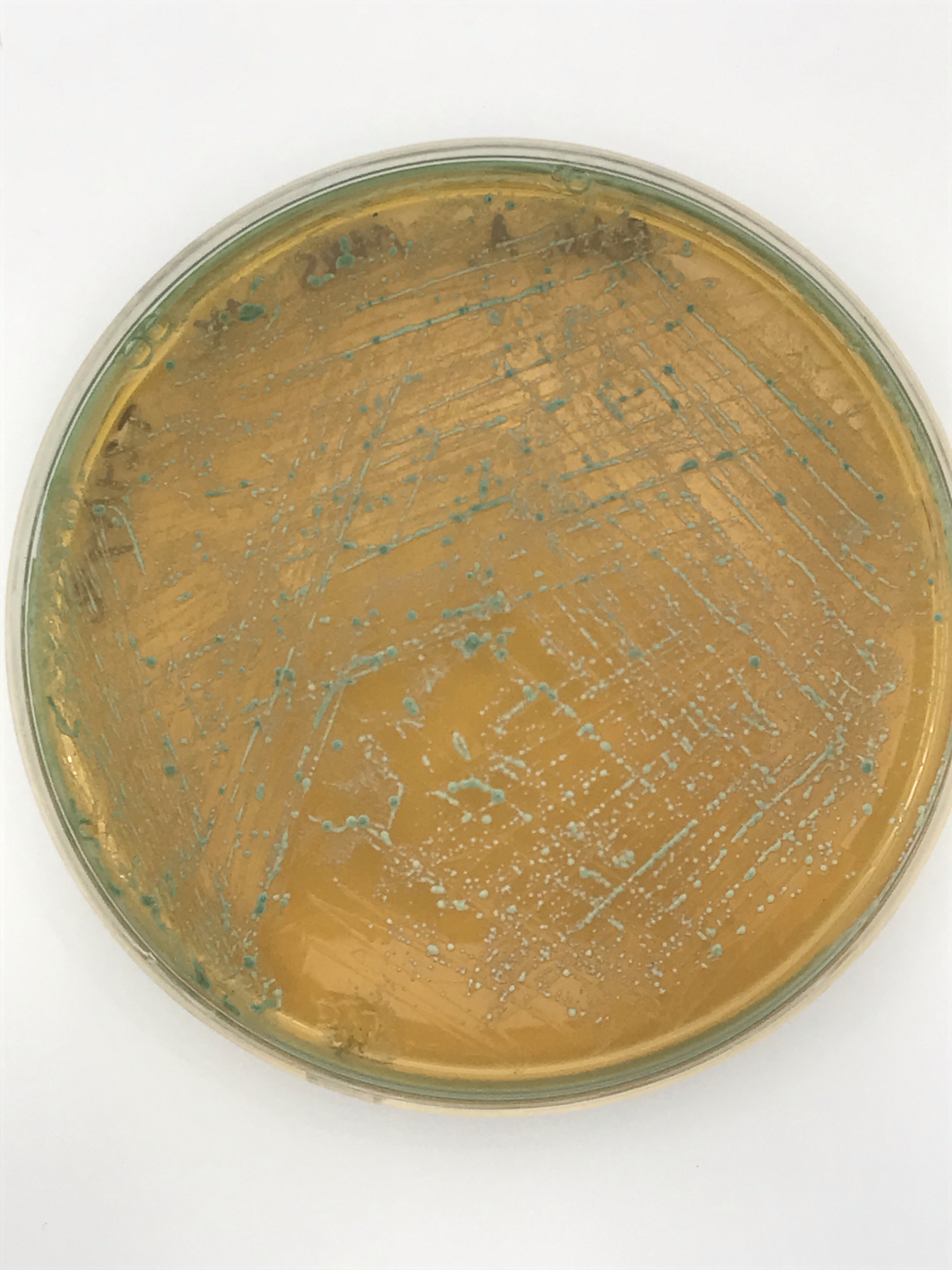
Pediococcus acidilactici colonies on an MRS agar plate

De Man–Rogosa–Sharpe agar, often abbreviated to MRS, is a selective culture medium designed to favour the luxuriant growth of Lactobacilli for lab study. Developed in 1960, this medium was named for its inventors, Johannes Cornelis de Man, Morrison Rogosa, and M Elisabeth Sharpe. It contains sodium acetate, which suppresses the growth of many competing bacteria (although some other Lactobacillales, like Leuconostoc and Pediococcus, may grow). This medium has a clear brown colour.

== Typical composition ==
MRS agar typically contains (w/v):

- 1.0% peptone
- 1.0% beef extract
- 0.4% yeast extract
- 2.0% glucose
- 0.5% sodium acetate trihydrate
- 0.1% polysorbate 80 (also known as Tween 80)
- 0.2% dipotassium hydrogen phosphate
- 0.2% triammonium citrate
- 0.02% magnesium sulfate heptahydrate
- 0.005% manganese sulfate tetrahydrate
- 1.0% agar
- pH adjusted to 6.2 at 25 °C

The yeast/meat extracts and peptone provide sources of carbon, nitrogen, and vitamins for general bacterial growth. The yeast extract also contains vitamins and amino acids required by Lactobacilli. Polysorbate 80 is a surfactant which assists in nutrient uptake by Lactobacilli. Magnesium sulfate and manganese sulfate provide cations used in metabolism.

== See also ==
- MacConkey agar (culture medium designed to grow Gram-negative bacteria and differentiate them for lactose fermentation).
