= XLD agar =

Selective culture medium

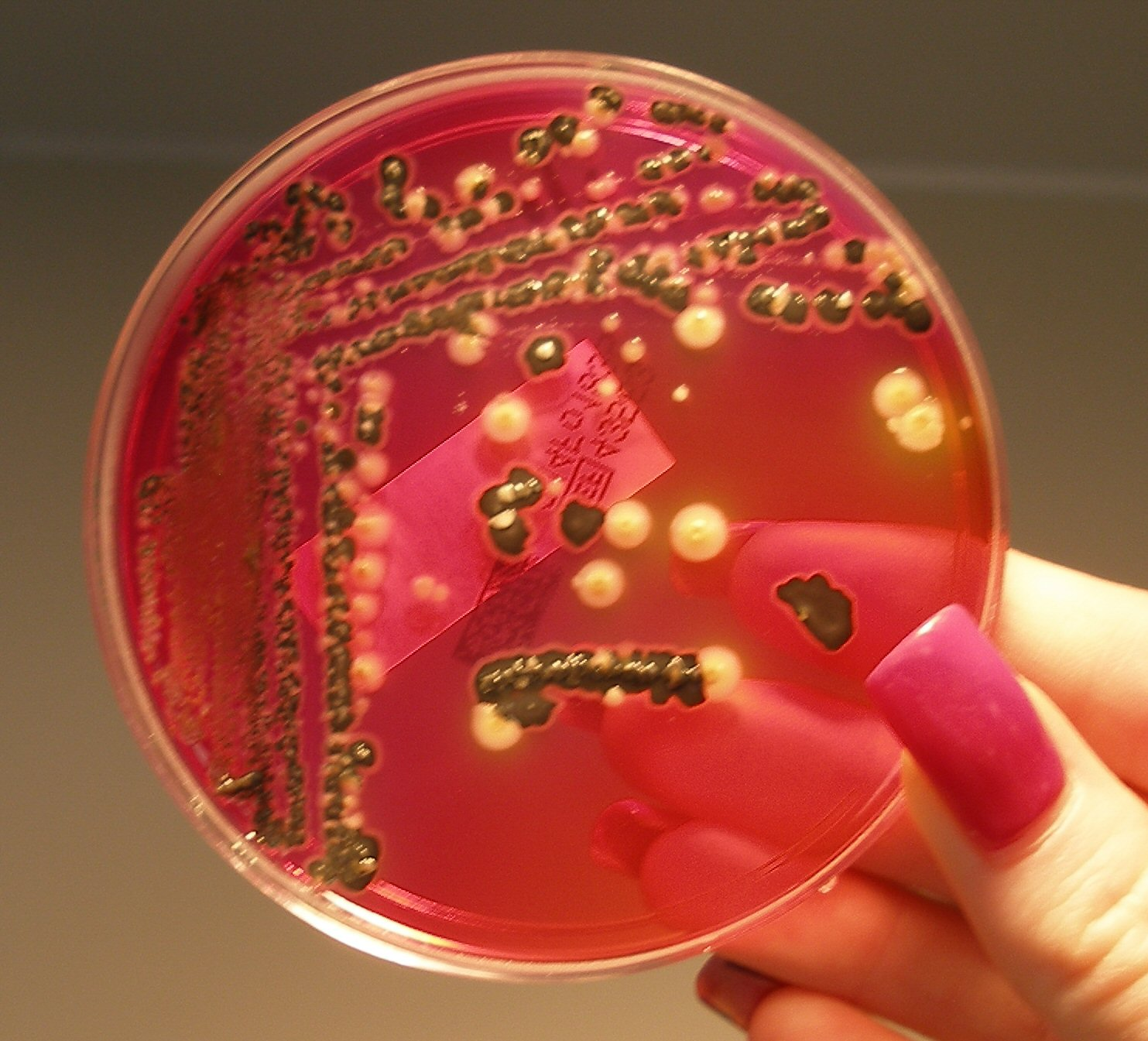
Salmonella growing on XLD agar

Xylose lysine deoxycholate agar (XLD agar) is a selective growth medium used in the isolation of Salmonella and Shigella species from clinical samples and from food.

== Composition and characteristics ==
It has a pH of approximately 7.4, leaving it with a bright pink or red appearance due to the indicator phenol red. Sugar fermentation lowers the pH and the phenol red indicator registers this by changing to yellow. Most gut bacteria, including Salmonella, can ferment the sugar xylose to produce acid; Shigella colonies cannot do this and therefore remain red. After exhausting the xylose supply Salmonella colonies will decarboxylate lysine, increasing the pH once again to alkaline and mimicking the red Shigella colonies. Salmonellae metabolise thiosulfate to produce hydrogen sulfide, which leads to the formation of colonies with black centers and allows them to be differentiated from the similarly coloured Shigella colonies.

Other enterobacteria such as E. coli will ferment the lactose present in the medium to an extent that will prevent pH reversion by decarboxylation and acidify the medium, turning it yellow.

- Salmonella species: red colonies, some with black centers. The agar itself will turn red due to the presence of Salmonella type colonies.
- Shigella species: red colonies.
- Coliforms: yellow to orange colonies.
- Pseudomonas aeruginosa: pink, flat, rough colonies. This type of colony can be easily mistaken for Salmonella due to the color similarities.

XLD agar contains:

Yeast extract	3g/l
L-lysine	5g/l
Xylose	3.75g/l
Lactose	7.5g/l
Sucrose	7.5g/l
Sodium deoxycholate	1g/l
Sodium chloride	5g/l
Sodium thiosulfate	6.8g/l
Ferric ammonium citrate	0.8g/l
Phenol red	0.08g/l
Agar	12.5g/l

== History ==
XLD agar was developed by Welton Taylor in 1965.

== See also ==
- Agar plate
- MRS agar
- R2a agar
