= Coprobacillaceae =

Scientific classification
- Domain: Bacteria
- Kingdom: Bacillati
- Phylum: Bacillota
- Class: Erysipelotrichia
- Order: Erysipelotrichales
- Family: Coprobacillaceae; Verbarg et al. 2020

Type genus
- Coprobacillus Kageyama and Benno 2000

Genera
- Allocoprobacillus; "Beduini"; Catenibacterium; Coprobacillus; Eggerthia; Faecalibacillus; "Ca. Fimiplasma"; Intestinibaculum; Kandleria; Longibaculum; Sharpea; "Ca. Stoquefichus"; Tannockella; Thomasclavelia

Synonyms
- "Erysipelatoclostridiaceae" Zakham et al. 2019

Family of bacteria

The Coprobacillaceae are a family of Bacillota.

== Phylogeny ==
The currently accepted taxonomy is based on the List of Prokaryotic names with Standing in Nomenclature (LPSN) and National Center for Biotechnology Information (NCBI)

16S rRNA based LTP_10_2024

- Coprobacillaceae
  - - Tannockella
    - - Faecalibacillus
      - Thomasclavelia
  - - - Coprobacillus
      - - Allocoprobacillus Teng et al. 2023
        - Longibaculum
    - - Catenibacterium
      - - Intestinibaculum
        - - Kandleria
          - - Eggerthia
            - Sharpea

120 marker proteins based GTDB 09-RS220

- Coprobacillaceae
  - "Ca. Fimiplasma" Gilroy et al. 2021
  - - "Beduini" Mourembou et al. 2015
    - - - Tannockella Pardesi et al. 2022
        - - Faecalibacillus Seo et al. 2019
          - Thomasclavelia Lawson, Saavedra Perez & Sankaranarayanan 2023
      - - - Allocoprobacillus Teng et al. 2023
          - - Coprobacillus corrig. Kageyama & Benno 2000
            - - Longibaculum Lagkouvardos et al. 2017
              - "Ca. Stoquefichus" Pfleiderer et al. 2013
        - - Catenibacterium Kageyama & Benno 2000
          - - - Intestinibaculum Kim et al. 2020
              - Kandleria Salvetti et al. 2011
            - - Sharpea Morita et al. 2008
              - Eggerthia Salvetti et al. 2011

== See also ==
- List of Bacteria genera
- List of bacterial orders
