= List of cryptosporidiosis outbreaks =

Cryptosporidiosis is a parasitic disease caused by Cryptosporidium. It can be spread by water or contact with contaminated surfaces.

== Canada ==
Year	Location	Number of cases	Outbreak source	Link to article	References
1996	Cranbrook	2,000			
1996	Kelowna	10,000–15,000			

== Italy ==
Year	Location	Number of cases	Outbreak source	Link to article	References
1995	Emilia-Romagna	294	Water supply		
2019	Tuscan–Emilian Apennines	75	Water supply		

== New Zealand ==
Year	Location	Number of cases	Outbreak source	Link to article	References
1995	Tauranga	1	School		
1997	Waikato	170			
1997	Tauranga	Unknown			
2003	Masterton	"Few"	Water supply		
2010	Auckland	7	Swimming pool		
2010	Christchurch	17	Unknown		
2013	Hawke's Bay	22	Swimming pool		
2013	Waikato	5	Unknown		
2013	Wellington	5	Unknown		
2013	Taranaki	3	Unknown		
2015	Auckland	6	Raw milk		
2017	Auckland	9	Childcare centre		
2018	Kapiti Coast	11	Water playground		
2021	Taranaki	6	Raw milk		
2021	Taranaki	4	Raw milk		
2023	Queenstown	72	Unknown	Queenstown cryptosporidiosis outbreak	

== Sweden ==
Year	Location	Number of cases	Outbreak source	Link to article	References
2010	Östersund	27,000	Water supply		
2011	Skellefteå	20,000	Water supply		
2015	Gothenburg	83	Food		

== United Kingdom ==
=== England ===
Year	Location	Number of cases	Outbreak source	Link to article	References
1989	Oxfordshire	500	Farmoor Reservoir		
1995	Torbay	508			
2008	Northamptonshire	22	Pitsford Reservoir		
2013	Gloucestershire	6	Farm		
2013	Kingston upon Hull	18	Swimming pool		
2016	Cornwall, Devon, Dorset, Gloucestershire, Somerset, Wiltshire	223	Swimming pool		
2016	Gateshead	7	Swimming pool		
2024	Brixham	100	Water supply	Devon cryptosporidiosis outbreak	

=== Northern Ireland ===
Year	Location	Number of cases	Outbreak source	Link to article	References
2000	Northern Ireland	129			
2000	Northern Ireland	117			
2001	Northern Ireland	275	Water supply		

=== Scotland ===
Year	Location	Number of cases	Outbreak source	Link to article	References
2000	Glasgow	90	Loch Katrine		
2000	Aberdeen	140	River Dee		
2000	Perth	8	Perth Leisure Pool		
2010	Cumbernauld	16	Swimming pool		

=== Wales ===
Year	Location	Number of cases	Outbreak source	Link to article	References
2005	Gwynedd	231	Llyn Cwellyn		
2012	Cwmbran	8	Farm		
2012	Newport	20	Swimming pool		

== United States ==
=== Florida ===
Year	Location	Number of cases	Outbreak source	Link to article	References
2019	Pasco County	10			

=== Georgia ===
Year	Location	Number of cases	Outbreak source	Link to article	References
1987	Carroll County	13,000		1987 Carroll County cryptosporidiosis outbreak	

=== Wisconsin ===
Year	Location	Number of cases	Outbreak source	Link to article	References
1993	Milwaukee	403,000		1993 Milwaukee cryptosporidiosis outbreak	
