= Cryptosporidium varanii =

Scientific classification
- Domain: Eukaryota
- Clade: Sar
- Superphylum: Alveolata
- Phylum: Apicomplexa
- Class: Conoidasida
- Order: Eucoccidiorida
- Family: Cryptosporidiidae
- Genus: Cryptosporidium
- Species: C. varanii

Binomial name
- Cryptosporidium varanii Pavlásek, Lávicková, Horák, Král & Král, 1995

Species of single-celled organism

Cryptosporidium varanii (syn. C. saurophilum) is a protozoal parasite that infects the gastrointestinal tract of lizards. C. varanii is often shed in the feces, and transmission is primarily via fecal-oral route. Unlike Cryptosporidium serpentis (that predominately infects snakes), C. varanii does not colonize the stomach, but rather the intestines of most infected lizards, such as geckos. An exception to this rule are monitor lizards, as gastric (stomach) lesions have been found in those species. Oocysts of lizard Cryptosporidium are larger than the snake counterpart.

In mammals, most Cryptosporidius infections (cryptosporidiosis) are self-limiting and treatment has been developed for livestock as well as humans. However, in lizards, the infection remains chronic and in most cases, eventually lethal. No proven cure exists for C. varanii, but some drugs may help treat symptoms. Since most lizards are ectothermic, higher temperatures have been correlated with an increased immune response, and may result in subsiding infection.

Cryptosporidium varanii has been primarily documented in captive lizards, although cryptosporidiosis does exist among free-living lizard species. It is among the most common infectious parasites found in zoos and private captive collections due to being extremely contagious in unsanitary conditions with very little (or complete absence thereof) biosecurity protocols. Lizards may ingest infective oocysts found in fecal-contaminated food and water. Facilities that have a high influx of reptiles entering and leaving with poor sanitary conditions, such as pet stores or reptile importation facilities, are particularly vulnerable.

Cryptosporidium varanii has been reported in at least 57 reptilian species, including captive Leopard geckos (Eublepharis macularius). It has been suggested that upward of 30 to 50 percent of all captive Leopard geckos are infected with Cryptosporidium.

Several other strains (both identified and unnamed) of Cryptosporidium, such as C. parvum and C. muris have been found in the gastrointestinal tracts of lizards, however the mammal equivalent appears non-infectious in reptilian hosts. Avian associated cryptosporidiosis has been found in Uromastyx spp. and Green iguanas (Iguana iguana) with detrimental effects. C. varanii has not been reported to infect humans or other mammals.
