= Water pollution in Haiti =

Environmental issue in Haiti

Pollution of water resources in Haiti, as with many developing countries, is a major concern. The main cause of water pollution in the country is major deficiencies in the collection of solid waste and the absence or dysfunction of wastewater sanitation. In addition, the considerable increase in the population over the last few decades, coupled with a lack of urban planning by successive authorities in the country, has led to massive degradation in the environment, while affecting the quality of available water resources. As a result, surface water and shallow groundwater are increasingly contaminated by micro-organisms such as bacteria, protozoa and viruses, exposing men, women and children to cholera, typhoid, Cryptosporidiosis and all kinds of waterborne diseases.

== Causes of pollution ==
=== Untreated sewages ===
Haiti does not have a collective system for the collection and treatment of wastewater. Sanitation, when it exists in Haiti, is autonomous in nature, where the individual is responsible for the management and evacuation of the water he produces. As a result, gray water generally ends up in open drainage channels that have been sized only for stormwater drainage. On the other hand, when drainage channels do not exist, they are then evacuated on the ground near the houses. This promotes contamination by runoff and infiltration of surface water and groundwater.

As for black water, the observation is overwhelming: in Haiti, only 26% of the population has access to improved sanitation systems, with a partition of 34.5% in urban areas and 17% in rural areas. Note that more than half of these toilets were not built on septic tanks, and they are not regularly emptied. In addition, the emptying of sanitary systems, when it is done, is most often carried out by manual drainers, and the excreta is simply thrown into canals or waterways. Indeed, the country has a single functional excreta treatment center with a capacity of 500 m3 per day, for a population of nearly 12,000,000 inhabitants and an area of 27,750 km^{2}.

=== Other problems ===
In recent years, Haiti has experienced significant demographic growth and unplanned urbanization from rural areas to urban areas, particularly the Port-au-Prince metropolitan region. This has led to the creation of numerous slums without access to the most basic services. These areas are also major producers of solid waste, which is generally dumped in ravines, street corners, roadsides, and other open spaces. In fact, studies of waste management in Port-au-Prince showed that 87.7% of the poorest households used ravines to dispose of their waste.

All of these poor sanitation practices, combined with shallow aquifers and fractured rocks, result in widespread contamination, either through runoff and/or infiltration of polluted effluents, of the country's ground and surface water resources.

== Solutions ==
Addressing water pollution in Haiti requires a multifaceted approach that considers both immediate interventions and long-term solutions. Here are several strategies that can help curb water pollution in Haiti:

1. Improving Sanitation Infrastructure: Promoting the construction and maintenance of proper sanitation facilities such as toilets and sewage treatment systems can prevent untreated sewage from contaminating water sources.
2. Implementing Waste Management Practices: Establishing effective waste collection and disposal systems to reduce plastic and solid waste pollution in rivers, lakes, and coastal waters.
3. Promoting Sustainable Agriculture: Encouraging the adoption of organic farming practices and reducing the use of chemical fertilizers and pesticides to minimize agricultural runoff into water bodies.
4. Protecting Watershed Areas: Implementing measures to protect and restore critical watershed areas through reforestation and erosion control to prevent sedimentation and runoff pollution.
5. Educating Communities: Conducting educational campaigns to raise awareness about the importance of clean water, proper waste disposal, and hygiene practices among communities.
6. Regulating Industrial Discharges: Enforcing regulations on industrial wastewater discharge to ensure that pollutants from factories and industries do not contaminate water sources.
7. Investing in Water Treatment Technologies: Installing and maintaining water treatment facilities to improve access to clean and safe drinking water for communities.
8. Collaborating with International Organizations: Partnering with international organizations and NGOs to provide technical expertise, funding, and resources for water pollution control projects.

== Quality of water resources ==
No recent survey has been carried out at the national level on the quality of water used daily by the population. However, according to a survey carried out in April 2012 in the Department of Artibonite, out of 108 sources tested for water quality, 2/3 of them presented traces of E. Coli (Escherichia coli) and 25.9%. had a concentration of more than 100 MPN/100mL which is very high-risk levels for human health.

Other studies carried out in the three main cities of the country, namely Port-au-Prince, Cap-Haïtien and Les Cayes, have shown the presence of microorganisms such as Giardia and Cryptosporidium at levels dangerous for the population. Indeed, values of 4 to 1274 cryptosporidium oocysts and 741 to 6088 Cryptosporidium oocysts were found in Port-au-Prince and Cap-Haïtien, in waters intended for use by the population.

The presence of these microorganisms in Haiti's waters is a marker of faecal contamination.

== Related diseases ==
Water-borne diseases such as diarrhea, cholera, cryptosporidiosis, among others, are very common in the country. In this sense, they present a high health risk for the most vulnerable.

Easily catchable diseases, such as diarrhea and those resulting in malnutrition, kill between 20% and 28% of children aged 0 to 5, respectively. Cryptosporidiosis is a common cause of diarrhea in Haiti. It is responsible for 17.5% of acute diarrhea affecting children under 2 years old and 30% of chronic diarrhea affecting people with HIV.

Between October 2010 and February 2019, an epidemic of cholera introduced by Nepalese soldiers caused the death of nearly 10,000 people and infected more than 820,000. Only, to find a resurgence in October 2022 which have already affected 4 department in the country, with a total of 6,814 suspected cases of which 5,628 have been hospitalized and cause 144 deaths as of 6 November 2022.
