= Cryptosporidium hominis =

Scientific classification
- Domain: Eukaryota
- Clade: Diaphoretickes
- Clade: SAR
- Clade: Alveolata
- Phylum: Apicomplexa
- Class: Conoidasida
- Order: Eucoccidiorida
- Family: Cryptosporidiidae
- Genus: Cryptosporidium
- Species: C. hominis

Binomial name
- Cryptosporidium hominis Morgan-Ryan, Fall, Ward, Hijjawi, Sulaiman, Fayer, Thompson, Olson, Lal and Xiao, 2002

Species of single-celled organism

Cryptosporidium hominis, along with Cryptosporidium parvum, is among the medically important Cryptosporidium species. It is an obligate parasite of humans that can colonize the gastrointestinal tract resulting in the gastroenteritis and diarrhea characteristic of cryptosporidiosis. Unlike C. parvum, which has a rather broad host range, C. hominis is almost exclusively a parasite of humans. As a result, C. hominis has a low zoonotic potential compared to C. parvum. It is spread through the fecal-oral route usually by drinking water contaminated with oocyst laden feces. There are many exposure risks that people can encounter in affected areas of the world. Cryptosporidium infections are large contributors of child death and illness in heavily affected areas, yet low importance has been placed on both identifying the species and finding more treatment options outside of nitazoxanide for children and AIDS patients.

== Characteristics ==
Cryptosporidium hominis shares many similar characteristics with C. parvum including identical oocyst morphology and life-cycle. The different cryptosporidium species share nearly identical morphological features, so differentiation is only seen at the molecular level. As a result, C. hominis is most easily differentiated from C. parvum through genetic analysis via time-intensive PCR-restriction fragment length polymorphism or gene sequencing.

== Life cycle ==
The life cycle of Cryptosporidium hominis is similar to that of others of the genus with infective sporozoites from ingested oocysts invading gut epithelium. From there, they undergo merogony and generate merozoites, which escape and can reinvade additional cells and form a secondary meront. The secondary meront then releases secondary merozoites which reinvade and undergo gametogony forming micro and macrogametocytes. The gametocytes can then fuse, forming a zygote, which starts the cycle again.

== Treatment ==
Though symptoms in most immunocompetent persons will resolve without treatment, nitazoxanide has been approved for treatment of diarrhea resulting from cryptosporidiosis. The effectiveness of nitazoxanide in immunocompromised patients, however, is uncertain and current treatments revolve around boosting the host immune system to aid in symptom resolution. Current avenues for treatment include scanning the Cryptosporidium hominis genome for possible targets for vaccine development.
