= Pyruvate synthase =

Class of enzymes

pyruvate synthase
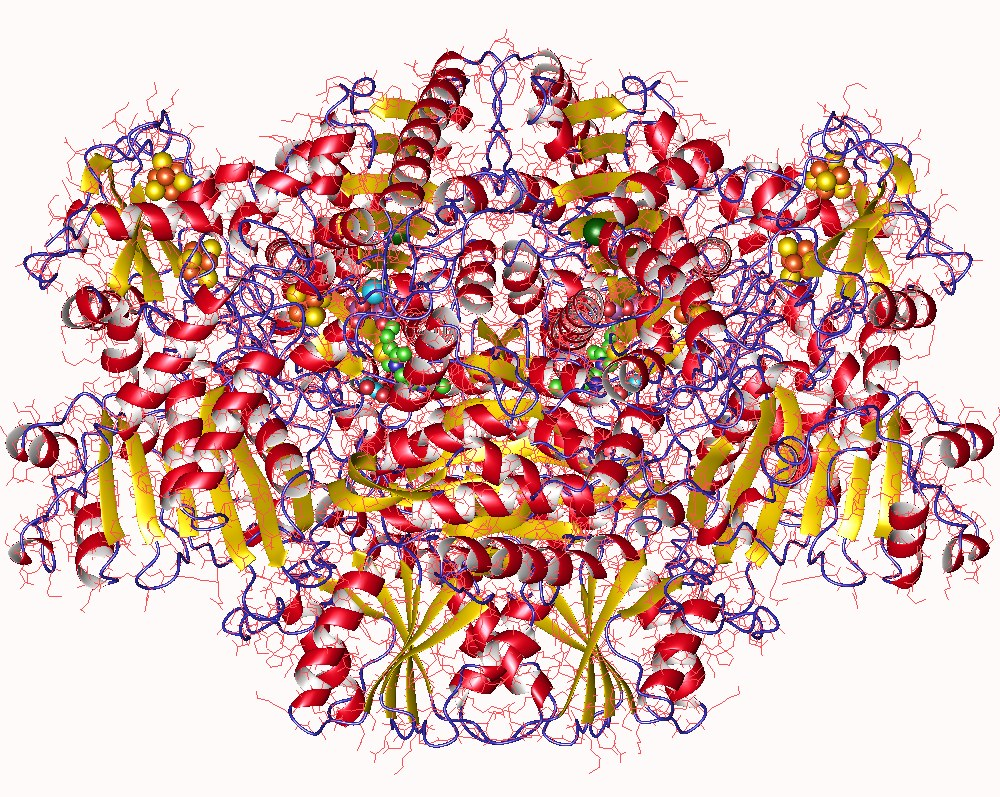
- pyruvate synthase dimer, Desulfovibrio africanus

Identifiers
- EC no.: 1.2.7.1
- CAS no.: 9082-51-3

Databases
- BRENDA: enzyme data
- ExPASy: NiceZyme view
- KEGG: enzyme entry
- MetaCyc: metabolic pathway
- Rhea: reactions
- PDB structures: RCSB PDB PDBe PDBsum
- Gene Ontology: AmiGO / QuickGO
Search
- PMC: articles
- PubMed: articles
- NCBI: proteins

In enzymology, pyruvate synthase (EC 1.2.7.1) is an enzyme that catalyzes the interconversion of pyruvate and acetyl-CoA. It is also called pyruvate:ferredoxin oxidoreductase (PFOR).

When the equilibrium favours the synthesis of pyruvic acid the reaction is:

acetyl-CoA
+ reduced
ferredoxin
CO_{2} + 2 H^{+}
CO_{2} + 2 H^{+}
pyruvic acid
+ coenzyme A
+ oxidised ferredoxin

The substrates are acetyl-CoA, carbon dioxide, two protons, and reduced ferredoxin. The products are then pyruvic acid, coenzyme A, and oxidized ferredoxin.

== Function ==
This enzyme participates in four metabolic pathways: pyruvate metabolism, propanoate metabolism, butanoate metabolism, and reductive carboxylate cycle (CO_{2} fixation).

Its major role is the extraction of reducing equivalents by the decarboxylation. In aerobic organisms, this conversion is catalysed by pyruvate dehydrogenase, which also uses thiamine pyrophosphate (TPP) but relies on lipoate as the electron acceptor. Unlike the aerobic enzyme complex PFOR transfers reducing equivalents to flavins or iron-sulfur clusters. This process links glycolysis to the Wood–Ljungdahl pathway.

== Nomenclature ==
This enzyme belongs to the family of oxidoreductases, specifically those acting on the aldehyde or oxo group of donor with an iron-sulfur protein as acceptor. The systematic name of this enzyme class is pyruvate:ferredoxin 2-oxidoreductase (CoA-acetylating). Other names in common use include:

- pyruvate oxidoreductase,
- pyruvate synthetase,
- pyruvate:ferredoxin oxidoreductase,
- pyruvic-ferredoxin oxidoreductase.

== Structure ==
PFOR adopts a dimeric structure, while each monomeric subunit is composed of one or multiple chain(s) of polypeptides. Each monomeric subunit of PFOR consists of six domains binding one TPP molecule and three [4Fe-4S] clusters.

== Catalytic mechanism ==
An PFOR reaction starts with the nucleophilic attack of C2 of TPP on the 2-oxo carbon of pyruvate, which forms a lactyl-TPP adduct. Next, the lactyl-TPP adduct releases the CO_{2} moiety, forming an anionic intermediate, which then transfer an electron to a [4Fe-4S] cluster. These steps lead to a stable radical intermediate that can be observed by electron paramagnetic resonance (EPR) experiments. The radical intermediate reacts with a CoA molecule, transfers another electron from the radical intermediate to a [4Fe-4S] cluster and forms an acetyl-CoA product.

== Related medications ==
=== Inhibitors ===
- Nitazoxanide is a broad-spectrum antiparasitic drug and FDA-approved PFOR inhibitor which is used for the treatment of Giardiasis and Cryptosporidiosis.
- Tizoxanide, an active metabolite of nitazoxanide
- Amixicile, a water-soluble derivative of nitazoxanide, is a potent inhibitor of pyruvate:ferredoxin oxidoreductase and is in pre-clinical studies to treat infections of Helicobacter pylori and Clostridioides difficile.

=== Others ===
- Metronidazole, a wide-spectrum antibiotic that targets anaerobic organisms, receive electron from the reduced ferredoxin produced by PFOR, thus turning into highly reactive nitrous free radical that destroy DNA and other vital biomolecules.
