= Devon cryptosporidiosis outbreak =

2024 disease outbreak in Devon, England

2024 Devon cryptosporidiosis outbreak
- Torbay shown within Devon
- Disease: Cryptosporidiosis
- Pathogen: Cryptosporidium
- Location: Torbay, Devon, England
- Date: 14 May – 8 July 2024
- Confirmed cases: 118
- Suspected cases^{‡}: >1000
- Hospitalised cases: 2
- Deaths: 0

In May 2024, an outbreak of cryptosporidiosis, a parasitic waterborne illness, started in Brixham in south Devon, England. The UK Health Security Agency (UKHSA) reported 118 cases of the illness, however residents of Brixham claimed that more than 1,000 people were left ill over the summer.

At its height, the outbreak left 17,000 properties under a boil water notice. After South West Water's (SWW) final notice was lifted on 8 July, all affected customers were automatically paid compensation due to the disruption, costing Pennon, the owners of SWW, £3.5 million; the outbreak and its aftermath cost Pennon a total of £16 million.

== Timeline ==
On 14 May 2024, the outbreak was first reported by the media with sixteen cases of cryptosporidiosis being confirmed in Brixham by the UK Health Security Agency (UKHSA). The agency said a further 70 people reported diarrhoea and vomiting in the town and said it was working with Torbay Council, South West Water (SWW), NHS Devon and the Environment Agency to investigate the cases. They also said investigations into the source were ongoing and that cases were likely to rise. SWW advised customers to use their water as normal and reviewed the operation of their water treatment works which showed no issues.

The next day the number of reported cases had risen to 22, with small traces of cryptosporidium being detected in the drinking supply around Brixham the previous night. Following the detection of the organism in a section of their network, SWW issued a boil water notice to residents in Alston and the Hillhead area of Brixham, advising them to boil their tap water before consuming. The company said bottled water stations were being set up and also told people in Boohay, Kingswear, north-west Paignton and Roseland not to drink tap water unless it had been boiled. The head of water quality at SWW, Chris Rockey, told the BBC that people should boil water to drink, cook and clean their teeth with in the affected areas and said he was unable to provide a timeframe for how long the water boiling would last. The company said that customers who were issued with the boiling notice will receive an automatic payment of £15. Conservative MP for Totnes, Anthony Mangnall, said SWW's delayed response was "enormously frustrating" and criticised their initial denial. SWW added it was "urgently investigating" and apologised for the inconvenience. Torbay Council and Devon County Council passed on SWW's advice to residents in Brixham, Broadsands, Churston, Galmpton, Hookhills, Kingswear and White Rock on their websites following the detection of cryptosporidium.

On 16 May, up to 100 people had reported symptoms to their GPs in the space of a week and a primary school in Brixham closed, saying running a school without drinking water was "not possible". SWW said they were investigating the Hillhead reservoir and the wider Alston area - an area which supplies 40,000 residents' water - as a potential cause for the outbreak. Paul Hunter, a specialist in microbiology and infectious disease at the University of East Anglia, said cases would continue to climb even after the source was found as it can take up to 10 days before people become ill from cryptosporidium. SWW's initial compensation payment of £15 was raised by £100 to £115, which they confirmed would be automatically paid into customers' accounts. The director of Visit Devon expressed her concern for the future of tourism in the area, saying that the national media coverage could have a knock on effect to bookings and worried that people may look at Devon rather than just Brixham and Paignton and avoid the area for the time being.

On 17 May the number of reported cases rose to 46 whilst around 70 other cases of diarrhoea and vomiting were under investigation by the UKHSA. SWW's chief customer officer Laura Flowerdew refused to give a timeline on the incident and said that a faulty valve may have allowed the parasite into the water network, causing the outbreak. A spokeswoman for Downing Street announced that the incident would be "investigated thoroughly" by the Drinking Water Inspectorate and UKHSA. 16,000 homes and businesses remained unable to use their tap water following the boil water notice issued two days prior as SWW's CEO Susan Davy said she was "truly sorry" for the crisis and admitted the company had "fallen significantly short". The company said that investigations and testing were continuing and said they had distributed 129,000 two litre bottles of water. NHS Torbay asked those with vomiting or diarrhoea symptoms to stay at home and drink plenty of water. In Brixham, a business owner said the outbreak had "destroyed" his business as tourists were making cancellations, and cars were seen queueing for over half a mile at a bottled water collection point. A warning was issued by SWW regarding scamming after some customers reported receiving calls regarding their compensation.

The boil water notice was lifted for 14,500 properties in the Alston supply area on 18 May via letters from SWW, however 28 properties were wrongly told that they could stop boiling their water and were sent an additional letter a few hours later advising them to continue boiling it and offering an extra £75 compensation, with SWW blaming its digital mapping system for the mistake.

On 20 May the environment secretary Steve Barclay confirmed that two people had been admitted to hospital after contracting the illness. By 21 May the number of confirmed cases it was investigating had risen to 57.

On 23 May, a 58-year-old woman from Stourbridge who had contracted cryptosporidiosis after travelling to Brixham on 2 May said she had contacted specialist Public Health lawyers to investigate her illness and said that authorities in the West Midlands had called her regarding her condition.

On 24 May, the number of reported cases rose to 77 as the compensation payment rose again to £265 for residents still under the boil water notice. SWW's bottled water stations continued to operate from 7 a.m. to 9 p.m. daily in Broadsands, Churston and Freshwater Quarry.

The number of reported cases reached 100 on 27 May, with SWW saying "further intense work" was needed to "fully remove any contamination" following the outbreak.

On 14 June, 21 properties had their boil water notices lifted. A further 902 properties had the notice lifted on 26 June in the Hillhead Park, Kingswear, Noss Marina and Raddicombe supply zones.

On 2 July, the boil water notice was lifted for a further 731 properties in the Chestnut Drive and Summercombe area, however it remains in place for 678 properties in the Higher Brixham, Southdown, St Mary's and Upton Manor areas. South West Water said that since the outbreak's source was found they had flushed over 34 km (21 mi) of water pipes, laid 1.2 km (0.75 mi) of new pipes, flushed the network 27 times and installed ultraviolet treatment and microfilters to provide barriers to remove cryptosporidium within the network.

The final notices were lifted on 8 July, with the UKHSA saying no new cases have been reported since. A meeting held by a Brixham resident for concerned locals regarding the outbreak was held at Brixham Rugby Club on 24 July. A second meeting was due to be held on 7 August to gather evidence about the outbreak.

The owner of South West Water, Pennon, announced that the outbreak had cost them a total of £16 million. They attributed these costs to paying compensation to affected customers, providing bottled water for two months, and the 'extensive' action they took to clean the network. The costs could have been greater if reforms announced by environment secretary Steve Reed were enacted at the time. These proposals would mean water companies have to pay households when boil water notices are issued.

In October, locals called for legal action, claiming over 1,000 people had been ill and that their lives had been 'destroyed' by the outbreak. Hundreds of people were still refusing to drink their tap water as several people continued to suffer serious health issues. The residents called for SWW to be prosecuted, claiming the company lied to them and 'manipulated' them into believing the supply was safe. In regard to the true number of cases, the UKHSA said that a total of 118 cases of cryptosporidiosis were confirmed but acknowledged that many others experienced symptoms.
