= 1993 Milwaukee cryptosporidiosis outbreak =

1993 cryptosporidium protozoan outbreak in Milwaukee, Wisconsin

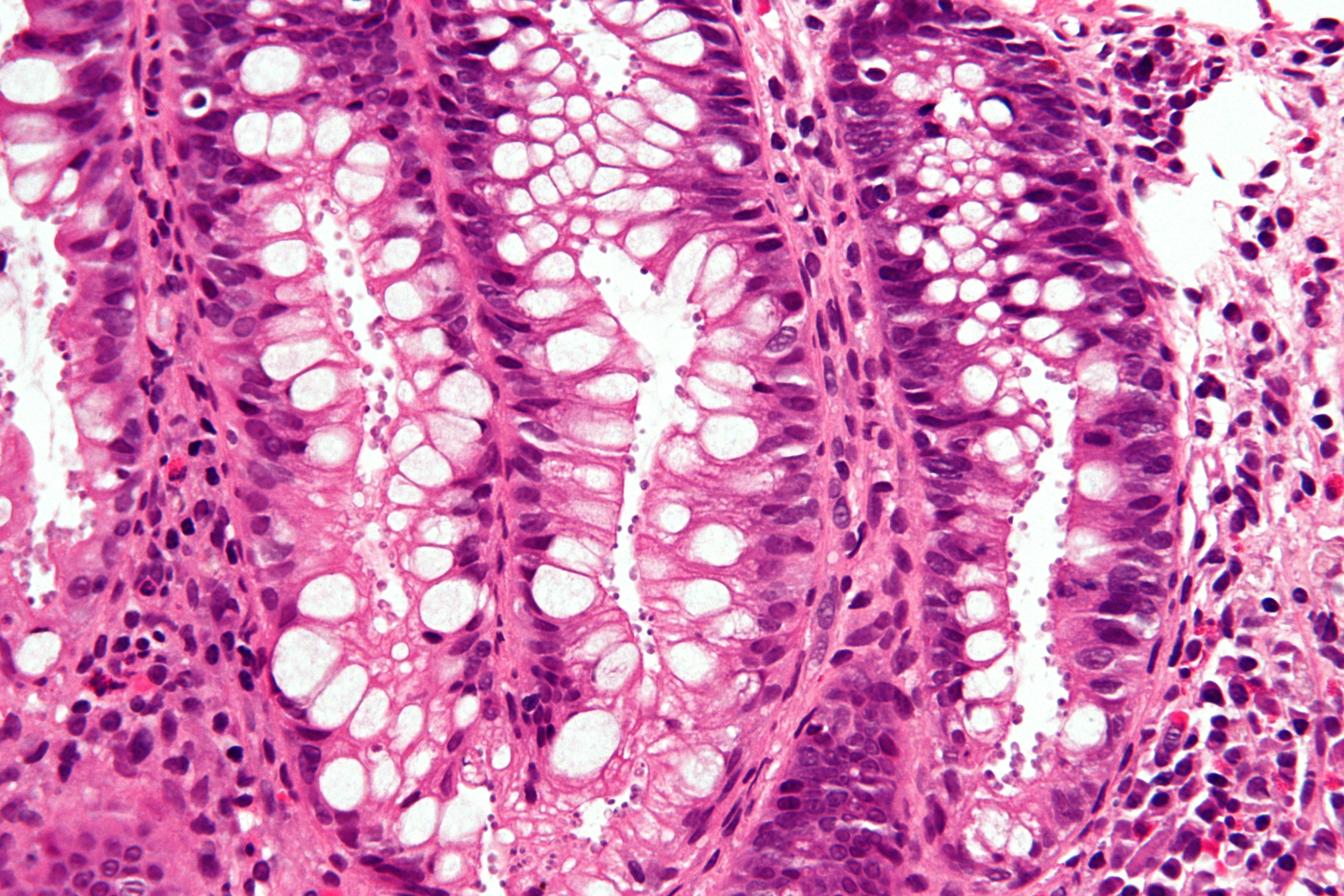
- cryptosporidiosis (cryptosporidium infection)
- Disease: Cryptosporidiosis
- Pathogen: Cryptosporidium
- Source: Contaminated water filtration plant
- Location: Milwaukee, Wisconsin
- First reported: April 4, 1993
- Confirmed cases: 403,000
- Deaths: 69

The 1993 Milwaukee cryptosporidiosis outbreak was a significant distribution of the Cryptosporidium protozoan in Milwaukee, Wisconsin, and the largest waterborne disease outbreak in documented United States history. It is suspected that The Howard Avenue Water Purification Plant, one of two water treatment plants in Milwaukee at the time, was contaminated. It is believed that the contamination was due to an ineffective filtration process.

Approximately 403,000 residents were affected, and 4,400 were hospitalized. Immediate repairs were made to the treatment facilities along with continued infrastructure upgrades during the 25 years since the outbreak. The total cost of the outbreak, in productivity loss and medical expenses, was $96 million. Attendance at schools were severely affected, and schools had to throw away 68,000 servings of Jell-O due to the possibility that it was contaminated. At least 69 people died as a result of the outbreak.

The city of Milwaukee has spent upwards to $510 million in repairs, upgrades, and outreach to citizens.

== Epidemiology ==
Cryptosporidium are a chlorine-resistant enteric pathogens that cause gastrointestinal illness (cryptosporidiosis) with symptoms such as diarrhea. Other symptoms include stomach cramps, dehydration, nausea, vomiting, fever, or weight loss. Symptoms can be more severe for people who are immunocompromised, for whom diarrhea can lead to death. Enteric pathogens are microorganisms that humans ingest, typically through contaminated food or water. Since Cryptosporidium is a coccidian parasite, it has oocysts. An oocyst is a period in the life cycle of a coccidian parasite. The oocysts in Cryptosporidium are the transmissible stage for cryptosporidiosis.

Most reports do not specify the species of Cryptosporidium involved in the outbreak. Several species cause cryptosporidiosis in humans, with most caused by Cryptosporidium parvum and Cryptosporidium hominis. However adding to the confusion, these two species were only split from each other in 2002. In 2003, Phaedra S. Corso et al. imply without evidence that it was C. parvum. In 2001, Alicia C. McDonald et al. clearly state that C. parvum is the cause, but the 1994 source they cite does not specify the species. McDonald et al. do find positive results testing blood samples with antigens derived from C. parvum, but a 2018 paper from Sumeeta Khurana and Preeti Chaudhary indicate that antigen tests are not species-specific and that molecular methods are needed to differentiate other species. A 2003 study by Ling Zhou et al. specifically addresses these issues and clearly identifies the pathogen in this outbreak as C. hominis.

== History ==
On April 4, 1993, pharmacist Jeff Langer contacted a local television station after the Milwaukee Health Department did not respond to his calls regarding substantial increase in gastrointestinal complaints. Sunday evening, April 4, the station came out to interview Jeff Langer regarding the substantial increase in requests for anti-diarrhea medications. Following that television interview, April 5, 1993, Milwaukee Health Department received additional reports of gastrointestinal illness at their local hospitals and calls of complaints related to reduced water-quality aesthetic. Water aesthetics include taste, color, odor, hardness/softness, and turbidity. They are considered a secondary standard under the EPA National Primary Drinking Water Regulations (NPDWR).

Although these drinking aesthetics are under the EPA NPDWR, they are not federally enforced but are standard regulations that states may choose to adopt and enforce themselves. In the spring of 1993, turbidity was the main complaint. This was corroborated by Milwaukee Water Works records of Maximal Turbidity for both water treatment plants from March through April 1993.

== Causes ==
The root cause of the epidemic was never officially identified; however, it was most likely the result of human error at the Howard Avenue Water Treatment Plant. Initially it was suspected to be caused by runoff from upstream cattle pastures. It was also thought that melting ice and snowmelt carrying Cryptosporidium may have entered the water treatment plants through Lake Michigan.

Mac Kenzie et al. and the CDC showed that this outbreak was caused by Cryptosporidium oocysts that passed through the filtration system of one of the city's water-treatment plants, arising from a sewage treatment plant's outlet two miles upstream in Lake Michigan. This abnormal condition at the water purification plant lasted from March 23 through April 8, after which the plant was shut down. The increased turbidity of the treated water was mitigated by the added flocculant polyaluminum chloride, but peaked again on April 5 after the plant changed to alum three days prior. Over the span of approximately two weeks, 403,000 of an estimated 1.61 million residents in the Milwaukee area (of which 880,000 were served by the malfunctioning treatment plant) became ill with the stomach cramps, fever, diarrhea and dehydration caused by the pathogen. After the outbreak, cryptosporidiosis antibody rates among Milwaukee children reached 80%, compared to only 10% prior to the outbreak. Deaths have been attributed to this outbreak, mostly among the elderly and immunocompromised people, such as people with AIDS.

== Social impact ==
Reports of gastrointestinal illness began in April 1993; however, studies occurring after the outbreak confirmed that there were echoes of the epidemic beyond initial contamination as the population contracted the illness through secondary transmission. This resulted in negative public sentiment toward Milwaukee Water Works. Carrie Lewis, superintendent of Milwaukee water works in 2015, explained that "people had been hurt, they felt let down by their drinking water and it took a long time for them to believe that we knew what we were doing again," It took ten years for Milwaukee citizens to begin to trust the public water supply again with the help of frequent community outreach by the utility.

== Current treatment in Milwaukee ==
In the 2020s, Milwaukee consistently scored as one of the highest drinking water qualities in the state. This is due to $508 million invested in water treatment and monitoring improvements since the outbreak. Improvements in treatment include:

- Activated charcoal filtration (Actiflo Carb) removes certain drugs, disinfectants, antibiotics.
- Monitoring on each stream of flow (8 streams) – previously, streams were only monitored before and after branching off (no way to monitor individual streams).
- Collection pipe for water was moved further out in the lake to draw higher quality water.
- Ozone treatment (treatment of chlorine-resistant microorganisms, such as Cryptosporidium)
- Online monitoring/automation

== See also ==
- 1987 Carroll County cryptosporidiosis outbreak
- Pryor Avenue Iron Well
- Drinking water quality in the United States
