= Cryptosporidium serpentis =

Scientific classification
- Domain: Eukaryota
- Clade: Sar
- Superphylum: Alveolata
- Phylum: Apicomplexa
- Class: Conoidasida
- Order: Eucoccidiorida
- Family: Cryptosporidiidae
- Genus: Cryptosporidium
- Species: C. serpentis

Binomial name
- Cryptosporidium serpentis Norman D. Levine, 1980

Species of single-celled organism

Cryptosporidium serpentis is a protozoal parasite that infects the gastrointestinal tract of snakes. Sporated oocysts of C. serpentis are intermittently shed in the feces, and transmission is primarily via fecal-oral route. C. serpentis is a gastric parasite, primarily colonizing the stomach. Unlike mammalian Cryptosporidium - that is usually self-limiting - C. serpentis remains chronic and in most cases, eventually lethal in snakes once an animal has become symptomatic. However, recent advancements in detection have led to the identification of healthy carrier animals some of which have thus far remained in good health for years and cast doubt on previous assumptions about the lethality of the parasite, though it remains to be seen how many carriers will remain healthy and for how long as most such animals are euthanized immediately. Cryptosporidiosis infection has been documented in a variety of snake species worldwide, such as North American Corn snakes (Elaphe guttata guttata) and Australian Taipans (Oxyuranus scutellatus), both free-living and captive. Necropsy examinations of expired captive snakes infected with C. serpentis note characteristic gastric mucosal hypertrophy (enlargement of the stomach lining) that, in time, narrows the gastric lumen, resulting in classic symptoms of repetitive regurgitation and anorexia. Due to the enlargement of the stomach lining, a noticeable midbody bulge can be palpable and commonly visible. Frequent mucoid stools have been reported. However, some snakes will display no external symptoms at all throughout their lifetime, yet still remain infectious to counterparts.

No proven cure exists for C. serpentis, but some drugs, such as Paromomycin, have proven promising results in the treatment of captive King cobras (Ophiophagus hannah). Unfortunately, longer follow up studies with treatments in multiple individuals of other species, such as eastern indigo snakes saw the majority of animals test positive again with time. Also significantly more promising is the use of liquid bovine colostrum, carefully administered to the snake via a stomach tube lubricated with vegetable oil, and accompanied by thorough weekly cleaning of the terrarium with 7% hydrogen peroxide in a well-ventilated area and with the use of goggles and gloves. Bovine colostrum is readily available and was purchased independently to successfully treat a pet owner's snake who, despite all the suggestions in pet books to euthanize it, lived 10 years longer than expected because of bovine colostrum. However this treatment is generally not made available since the studies that produced it ended. Since snakes are ectothermic, higher temperatures have been correlated with an increased immune response, and may result in subsiding infection.

Recent anecdotal evidence suggests the overall animals microbiome plays a key role in asymptomatic animals, with those being born in captivity or treated for other ailments at higher risk of symptomatic disease making probiotics an area of interest for further studies. This would explain why wild animals rarely appear sick from the infection while captives often struggle significantly. Other areas identified as needing further research include examination of possible vertical transmission, identifying specific strains, tracing the distribution of such strains and the comparison of strains in long term asymptomatic animals against highly pathogenic strains.

Mammal associated Cryptosporidium, such as C. parvum and C. muris have been found in the gastrointestinal tracts of snakes (due to consuming infected rodents), however the mammal equivalent appears non-infectious in serpentine hosts. C. serpentis cannot infect humans or other mammals.
