= Penicillium cluniae =

Scientific classification
- Kingdom: Fungi
- Division: Ascomycota
- Class: Eurotiomycetes
- Order: Eurotiales
- Family: Aspergillaceae
- Genus: Penicillium
- Species: P. cluniae

Binomial name
- Penicillium cluniae Quintanilla 1990

Type strain
- CBS 326.89

Species of fungus

Penicillium cluniae is a fungus species of the genus of Penicillium which produces the antinematodal and antiparasitic agents paraherquamide B, paraherquamide C, paraherquamide D, paraherquamide E, paraherquamide F, paraherquamide G, paraherquamide H

== See also ==
- List of Penicillium species
