= Jean-François Rossignol =

- Born: France
- Education: University of Paris, Radium Institute
- Awards: Fellow of the Royal Society of Chemistry (FRSC), Fellow of the Royal College of Pathologists (FRCPath), Honorary Fellow of the Faculty of Pharmaceutical Medicine of the Royal Colleges of Physicians of the United Kingdom (HonFFPM), Fellow of the College of Physicians of Philadelphia (FCPP), Honorary doctorate from Nacional Universidad de Cajamarca (Peru), Honorary Member of the Colegio Medico del Peru
- Scientific career
- Fields: Parasitology, Tropical Medicine
- Workplaces: Romark Laboratories, L.C.

Jean-François Rossignol is a French scientist, a medicinal chemist and a physician, born in France on September 5, 1943. He was educated at the University of Paris, later specializing in tropical medicine. He then pursued a career in academia and in the pharmaceutical industry discovering and developing new drugs for the treatment of parasitic diseases such as halofantrine in the treatment of multidrug resistant Falciparum malaria or albendazole and nitazoxanide for the treatment of intestinal protozoan and helminthic infections. In 1993, he co-created his own pharmaceutical company, Romark Laboratories, L.C., to develop his own invention nitazoxanide, the first of the thiazolides. At Romark, he is the Chairman of the Board of Directors of the company and its Chief Science Officer. Following the discovery of the antiviral activity of the thiazolides Rossignol went to Stanford University in California to study interferon stimulated gene pathways and chronic viral hepatitis under Prof. Emmet Keeffe and Prof. Jeffery Glenn. It was in the Glenn laboratory that the mechanism of antiviral activity of nitazoxanide against the hepatitis C virus was discovered.

== Education ==
Rossignol began to study chemistry at the University of Paris under Prof. Paul Cadiot and prepared a doctorate degree in synthetic organic chemistry in the Department of Chemistry of the Radium Institute in Paris, originally the division of Radiobiology and Cancer Research of the Pasteur Institute. Created in 1911 by the Pasteur Institute and the University of Paris, the Radium Institute was the place where two generations of Curies, first Pierre and Marie Curie, later their daughter, Irène Joliot-Curie, and Frédéric Joliot, her husband, discovered natural and artificial radioactivity winning five Nobel prizes between 1903 and 1935. Profoundly marked by the Curie's legacy, Rossignol considered pursuing a career in nuclear physics. The Radium Institute and the adjacent Curie Foundation were also home to a major cancer hospital where Marie Curie and Claudius Regaud had initiated radiotherapy with the radium that Marie had discovered and where the first primitive treatments of cancer were applied, and ultimately, it was Rossignol's exposure to medicine during these years that would kindle his interest and determine his future orientation toward medical research.

== Nitazoxanide ==
Upon the defense of his dissertation in chemistry at the University of Paris, he returned to school to study medicine. During his last year at the Radium Institute, Rossignol had met Raymond Cavier, then Professor of Parasitology at the School of Pharmacy of the University of Paris where he was heading the parasitology laboratory searching for new drugs for the treatment of malaria and intestinal parasites. Cavier had tested some of the compounds Rossignol synthesized for his doctorate degree in chemistry, and he offered Rossignol the opportunity to join his laboratory while continuing his medical education. It would prove to be a good decision, and in 1974 Rossignol and Cavier discovered nitazoxanide, the first of thiazolides. Nitazoxanide was first tested in the Cavier's laboratory and was found effective against both intestinal protozoa and helminths in vitro or in laboratory animals and was first administered in humans in France in the treatment of Taenia saginata and Hymenolepsis nana in a small number of patients.

== Work in tropical medicine ==
In the early days of 1980, Rossignol met Prof. Pierre Pène in Marseille, France. Pène had spent his professional life in West Africa, first in Dakar in Sénégal, later in Abidjan in Côte d'Ivoire where he had founded the country's first medical school and eventually became its first dean. From Marseille, Pène trained Rossignol in tropical medicine. In the meantime, the pharmaceutical giant, SmithKline & French Laboratories in Philadelphia, Pennsylvania, aware of the work in parasitology carried out in the Cavier's laboratory in Paris, had put Rossignol in charge of developing the benzimidazole carbamate anthelminthic, albendazole, for the treatment of intestinal helminthiasis. From Marseille to Geneva, it was only a short trip to the Division of Parasitic Diseases at the World Health Organization under its director, Andrew Davis, and it would be there that two major antiparasitic drugs, praziquantel and albendazole, would be clinically developed. Praziquantel became a major advance in the treatment of schistosomiasis, effective against the five strains of the parasite. Albendazole was the first effective single dose nematocidal anthelminthic, one of the most widely used drugs in the developing world. Both medicines were included in the World Health Organization's List of Essential Drugs. Rossignol would work with Davis for the next 10 years.

While working with Cavier in Paris, Rossignol had also searched for antimalarial agents with the Antimalarial Drug Development Program of the United States Army Research & Development Command based at the Walter Reed Army Institute of Research in Washington D.C. He completed the work initiated by the Army with the antimalarial, halofantrine, and conducted three well-controlled clinical studies in France, in Mali, a country in West Africa, and in French Guiana in South America for the treatment of drug-sensitive and drug-resistant Falciparum malaria, involving SmithKline & French Laboratories in the process. Albendazole and halofantrine received their regulatory approvals in the United States from the Food and Drug Administration under the trade names of Albenza® and Halfan® respectively and were licensed in a large number of countries around the world. They are still commercialized today by GlaxoSmithKline, Plc, the successor of Smith Kline & French Laboratories.

== Development of Nitazoxanide and Other Thiazolides ==
In 1993, nitazoxanide was re-invented in collaboration with the National Institute of Allergy and Infectious Diseases at the National Institutes of Health in Bethesda, Maryland as the first effective treatment for the emerging apicomplexan protozoa, Cryptosporidium parvum. It was subsequently developed by Romark Laboratories, L.C. in both immunocompetent and immuno-suppressed individuals such as those with AIDS. It would be eventually approved in the United States by the Food & Drug Administration under the trade name of Alinia® for the treatment of non-immunodeficient adults and children from 12 months of age.

The serendipitous discovery of the antiviral activity of nitazoxanide and the discovery of its mechanism of action opened a new chapter in Rossignol's life and led to the discovery of an entirely new class of indirect antiviral drugs, acting in stimulating the production of interferons by the host's immune cells activating several interferon stimulated gene pathways known to block viral translation. More intriguing perhaps are the effects of thiazolides on adaptive immunity and more specifically on T Lymphocytes, B Lymphocytes and Natural Killer cells. It is the subject of intense research at Oxford University in the United Kingdom and at the National Institutes of Health in the United States and could lead to a new approach in the treatment of many other diseases such as AIDS but also some cancers or auto-immune diseases. Romark Laboratories quickly initiated the synthesis of hundreds of second generation thiazolides carried out in the United Kingdom at the University of Liverpool under Andrew Stachulski, and new derivatives are now entering clinical development in the treatment of viral diseases such as viral enteritis caused by rotavirus and norovirus, influenza and influenza like illnesses and chronic viral hepatitis B and C. Nitazoxanide, the first of the thiazolides was the first treatment ever discovered for cryptosporidial diarrhea, viral gastroenteritis caused by norovirus and rotavirus and respiratory syncytial virus. It was found safe enough to be given to infants from 2 to 12 months of age.

== Honors and awards ==
In the United Kingdom, Dr. Rossignol was elected Fellow of the Royal Society of Chemistry (FRSC), the Royal College of Pathologists (FRCPath) and Honorary Fellow of the Faculty of Pharmaceutical Medicine of the Royal Colleges of Physicians of the United Kingdom (HonFFPM). He is also a Fellow of the Royal Society of Tropical Medicine and Hygiene and the Royal Society of Medicine. In the United States he was elected fellow of the College of Physicians of Philadelphia (FCPP), the oldest medical association created in the new world more than 200 years ago. He is a member of the American Society of Tropical Medicine and Hygiene, the American Society for Microbiology, the American Chemical Society and the American Association for the Study of Liver Diseases. He received an honorary doctorate degree from the Nacional Universidad de Cajamarca in Peru. Cajamarca is a city hidden in the Andes Mountains where he spent many years with his medical team studying and treating tropical parasitic diseases. For his work in the local community he was also made honorary member of the Colegio Medico del Peru, the National Peruvian Medical Association. Dr. Rossignol held multiple faculty appointments with several universities but more importantly in the United States at Stanford University in California and in the United Kingdom at Oxford University, two institutions where he conducted most of his basic and clinical research. He has authored more than 100 peer-reviewed articles in scientific and medical journals and has been awarded 31 United States patents on new drugs for the treatment of infectious diseases. For 11 years, he served first as a consultant and later as an expert in parasitic diseases for the World Health Organization in Geneva, Switzerland. He has lived in the United States since 1982.
