= Ethanoligenens =

Scientific classification
- Domain: Bacteria
- Kingdom: Bacillati
- Phylum: Bacillota
- Class: Clostridia
- Order: Eubacteriales
- Family: Oscillospiraceae
- Genus: Ethanoligenens; Xing et al. 2006
- Species: E. harbinense

Binomial name
- Ethanoligenens harbinense Xing et al. 2006

Genus of bacteria

Ethanoligenens harbinense is a hydrogen-producing, fermenting bacterium that shows potential for bioenergy-related applications, including biofuel production from waste streams. It is the only species in the genus Ethanoligenens.

== Species description ==
It is Gram-positive, non-spore-forming, mesophilic and motile, its cells being regular rods (0.4–0.8×1.5–8.0 μm). Its type strain is YUAN-3^{T} (=JCM 12961^{T} =CGMCC 1.5033^{T}).

Ethanoligenens harbinense was named by Xing and co-authors in the original discovery paper, which reported that the bacterial strains had been isolated from molasses sludge wastewater. Ethanoligenens means 'ethanol-producing', and comes from 'ethanol' and the Latin verb 'genere', to produce; harbinense is a reference to Harbin, the city in China where the type strain was isolated.

Ethanoligenens harbinense metabolizes glucose and carbon sources to produce hydrogen, acetic acid, carbon dioxide, and ethanol. This metabolism is catalyzed by pyruvate ferredoxin oxidoreductase and genes encoding [Fe–Fe]-hydrogenase. [Fe–Fe]-hydrogenase has a specific role in the hydrogen gas production in Ethanoligenens harbinense. Since Ethanoligenens harbinense is a high hydrogen gas producing bacterium, it is often used as a model organism to study [Fe–Fe]-hydrogenase activity.

Ethanoligenens harbinense has the ability to produce bio-hydrogen through its metabolism, which can be used for sustainable energy technology. This has been shown to be feasible for affordable bio-hydrogen production by the use of bioreactors. The mechanisms that give Ethanoligenens harbinense the ability to produce bio-hydrogen by fermenting organic wastes, including wastewater, allows this bacteria to be crucial for biofuel and bioenergy production.
