= Cryptosporidium fragile =

Scientific classification
- Domain: Eukaryota
- Clade: Sar
- Clade: Alveolata
- Phylum: Apicomplexa
- Class: Conoidasida
- Order: Eucoccidiorida
- Family: Cryptosporidiidae
- Genus: Cryptosporidium
- Species: C. fragile

Binomial name
- Cryptosporidium fragile Jirků, 2008

Species of single-celled organism

Cryptosporidium fragile is a parasite which infects amphibians. The oocysts have an irregular, shape (subspherical to elliptical) and surface. The developing parasite is found in the gastric epithelial cells.

It was first discovered in a black-spined toad (Duttaphrynus melanostictus) originating from Malaysia. C. fragile is not associated with disease in humans.
