= Semper rehydration solution =

Mixture used for dehydration management

Semper rehydration solution is a mixture used for the management of dehydration. Each liter of Semper rehydration solution contains 189 mmol glucose, 40 mmol Na^{+}, 35 mmol Cl^{−}, 20 mmol K^{+} and 25 mmol HCO_{3}^{−}.
