= Tizoxanide =

Names
- Preferred IUPAC name 2-Hydroxy-N-(5-nitro-1,3-thiazol-2-yl)benzamide
- Other names Desacetyl-nitazoxanide

Identifiers
| CAS Number | 173903-47-4 |
| 3D model (JSmol) | Interactive image |
| ChEMBL | ChEMBL1545 |
| ChemSpider | 349588 |
| ECHA InfoCard | 100.263.225 |
| PubChem CID | 394397 |
| UNII | 15KFG88UOJ |
| CompTox Dashboard (EPA) | DTXSID40169680 |
- InChI: InChI=1S/C10H7N3O4S/c14-7-4-2-1-3-6(7)9(15)12-10-11-5-8(18-10)13(16)17/h1-5,14H,(H,11,12,15) Key: FDTZUTSGGSRHQF-UHFFFAOYSA-N; InChI=1/C10H7N3O4S/c14-7-4-2-1-3-6(7)9(15)12-10-11-5-8(18-10)13(16)17/h1-5,14H,(H,11,12,15) Key: FDTZUTSGGSRHQF-UHFFFAOYAR
- SMILES: O=C(Nc1ncc(s1)[N+]([O-])=O)c2ccccc2O

Properties
| Chemical formula | C_{10}H_{7}N_{3}O_{4}S |
| Molar mass | 265.25 g/mol |
- Except where otherwise noted, data are given for materials in their standard state (at 25 °C [77 °F], 100 kPa). verify (what is ?) Infobox references

Tizoxanide, also known as desacetyl-nitazoxanide, is a thiazolide and an antiparasitic agent that occurs as a metabolite of nitazoxanide in humans through hydrolysis. Tizoxanide may undergo further metabolism via conjugation into tizoxanide glucuronide.
