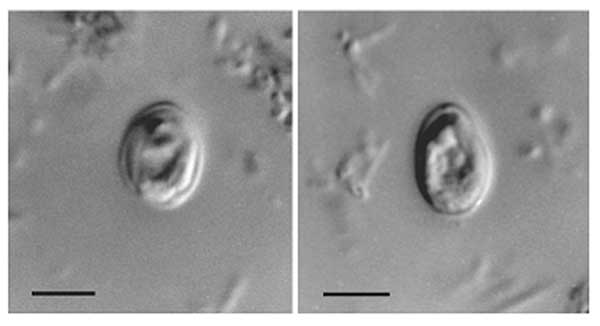
- Oocysts of C. muris found in human feces

Scientific classification
- Domain: Eukaryota
- Clade: Sar
- Clade: Alveolata
- Phylum: Apicomplexa
- Class: Conoidasida
- Order: Eucoccidiorida
- Suborder: Eimeriorina
- Family: Cryptosporidiidae
- Genus: Cryptosporidium; Tyzzer, 1907

Species
- See § Species

= Cryptosporidium =

Genus of single-celled organisms

Cryptosporidium, sometimes called crypto, is an apicomplexan genus of alveolates that are parasites that can cause a respiratory and gastrointestinal illness (cryptosporidiosis) that primarily involves watery diarrhea (intestinal cryptosporidiosis), sometimes with a persistent cough (respiratory cryptosporidiosis).

Treatment of gastrointestinal infection in humans involves fluid rehydration, electrolyte replacement, and management of any pain. For cryptosporidiosis, supportive treatment and symptom management are the primary treatments for immunocompetent individuals. Anti-diarrheal medication, such as Loperamide, may be effective in slowing the rate of diarrhea. Nitazoxanide is the only drug approved for the treatment of cryptosporidiosis in immunocompetent persons. Supplemental zinc may improve symptoms, particularly in recurrent or persistent infections or in others at risk for zinc deficiency. Cryptosporidium oocysts are 4–6 μm in diameter and exhibit partial acid-fast staining. They must be differentiated from other partially acid-fast organisms including Cyclospora cayetanensis.

== General characteristics ==
Cryptosporidium causes cryptosporidiosis, an infection that may present as a diarrhea, sometimes with a persistent cough in immunocompetent hosts. Other apicomplexan pathogens of humans include the malaria parasite Plasmodium and the toxoplasmosis parasite Toxoplasma. Unlike Plasmodium, which transmits via a mosquito disease vector, and Toxoplasma which needs a feline as definitive host, Cryptosporidium does not use a vector, and is capable of completing its lifecycle within a single host. It results in cyst stages that are excreted in feces or through inhalation of coughed on fomites and are capable of transmission to a new host.

A number of species infect mammals. In humans, the main causes of disease are C. parvum and C. hominis (previously C. parvum genotype 1). C. canis, C. felis, C. meleagridis, and C. muris can also cause disease in humans.

Cryptosporidiosis is typically an acute, short-term infection, but can recur through reinfection in immunocompetent hosts, or become severe or life-threatening in immunocompromised individuals. In humans, it remains in the lower intestine and may remain for up to five weeks. The parasite is transmitted by environmentally hardy cysts (oocysts) that, when ingested, remain in the small intestine and cause an infection of intestinal epithelial tissue. Transmission by ingestion or inhalation of coughed-on fomites is a second, less likely route of infection.

The genome of C. parvum, sequenced in 2004, was found to be unusual amongst eukaryotes in that the mitochondria seem not to contain DNA. A closely related species, C. hominis, has also had its genome sequenced.

== Life cycle ==
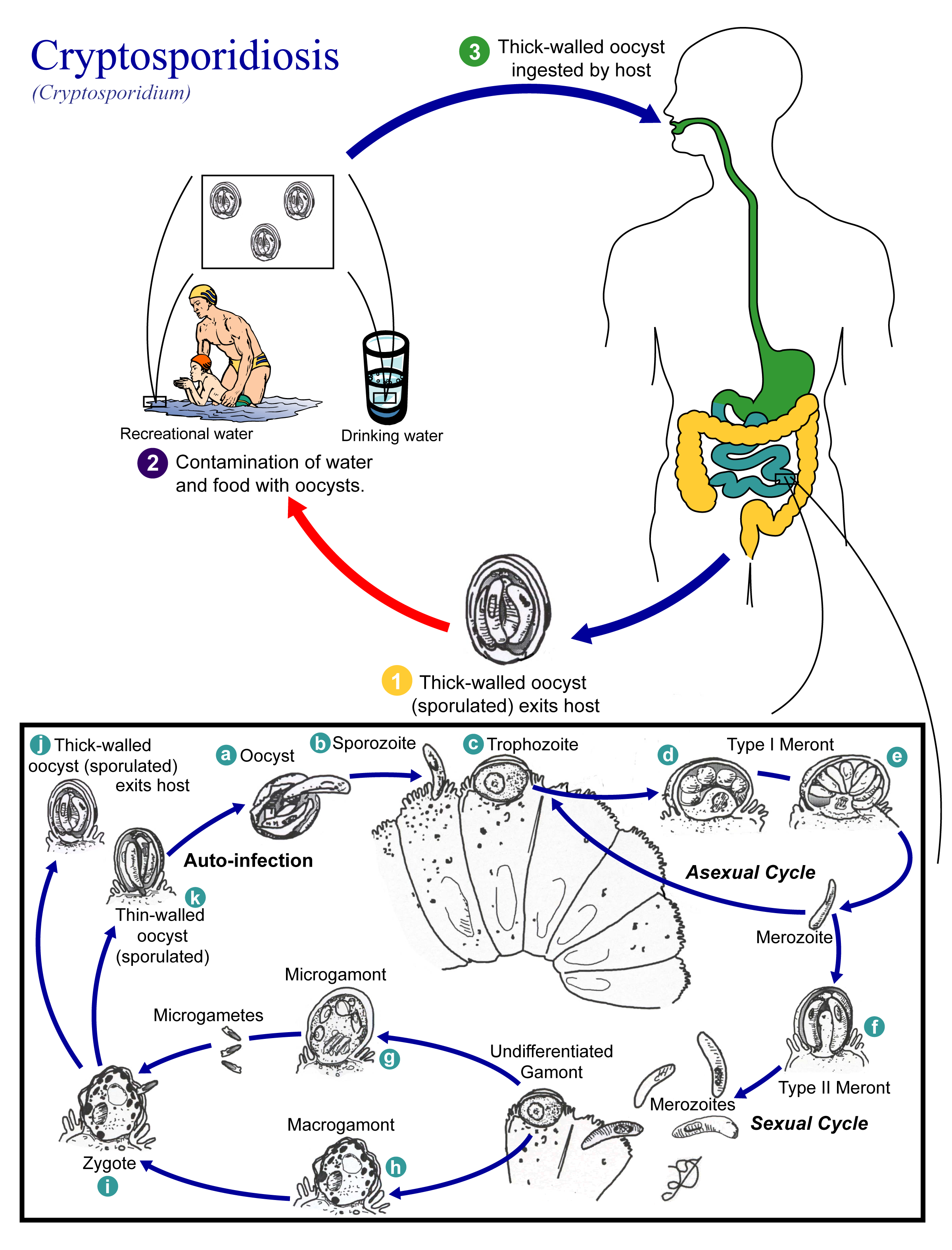
Life cycle diagram of Cryptosporidium

Cryptosporidium has three developmental stages: meronts, gamonts and oocysts. They reproduce within the intestinal epithelial cells. The Cryptosporidium spore phase (oocyst) can survive for lengthy periods outside a host. It can also resist many common disinfectants, including chlorine-based disinfectants.

== Immune system evasion ==
A Cryptosporidium infection in the intestine causes epithelial cells to activate multiple defense mechanisms. They secrete chemokines and cytokines to mobilize immune cells to the infection site. They also release antimicrobial peptides that are capable of targeting and killing parasite-free stages. Cryptosporidium has evolved to evade these host immune defenses to ensure survival throughout their life cycle.

The location at which Cryptosporidium reside, within an intracellular yet extra-cytoplasmic area in the parasitophorous vacuole (P.V.), limits the direct exposure of parasite antigens to immune cells, protects against phagocytosis, and prevents targeting by guanylate-binding proteins.

Cryptosporidium has also evolved mechanisms to regulate apoptosis and epithelial cell turnover in a stage-specific manner, which promotes the parasite's own growth and ensures completion of its life cycle. The role of NF-kB in the host cell response is critical, as this transcription factor is involved in both pro-apoptotic and anti-apoptotic signaling pathways.

== Water treatment and detection ==
Many treatment plants that take raw water from rivers, lakes, and reservoirs for public drinking water production use conventional filtration technologies. Direct filtration, which is typically used to treat water with low particulate levels, includes coagulation and filtration but not sedimentation. Other common filtration processes including slow sand filters, diatomaceous earth filters, and membranes will remove 99% of Cryptosporidium. Membranes and bag- and cartridge-filter products remove Cryptosporidium specifically.

Cryptosporidium is highly resistant to chlorine disinfection; but with high enough concentrations and contact time, Cryptosporidium inactivation will occur with chlorine dioxide and ozone treatment. In general, the required levels of chlorine preclude the use of chlorine disinfection as a reliable method to control Cryptosporidium in drinking water. Ultraviolet light treatment at relatively low doses will inactivate Cryptosporidium.

One of the largest challenges in identifying outbreaks is the ability to verify the results in a laboratory. The oocytes may be seen by microscopic examination of a stool sample, but they may be confused with other objects or artifacts similar in appearance. Most cryptosporidia are 3–6 μm in size, although some reports have described larger cells.

Boiling is believed to be the safest option for water contaminated by Cryptosporidium.

== Diagnosis ==
The most common approach in diagnosing cryptosporidiosis is detection of the Cryptosporidium oocysts, oocyst antigens, or oocyst DNA in stool samples. Due to the difficulty surrounding detection of these oocysts, there should be a minimum of three stool samples collected on three separate days to rule out the parasitic infection in patients with severe diarrhea. For a higher chance of detection, the stool sample should be concentrated using the formalin-ether sedimentation method prior to microscopy.Acid-fast or phenol-auramine staining on unconcentrated fecal smears can be used to stain the oocysts red or bright yellow, but oocysts have the ability to appear as "ghost" cells. These methods for the identification of oocysts in fecal smears have overall low sensitivities, so the use of ELISA and immunochromatographic tests for diagnosis are deemed more useful;The latter options also allow for specificity of Cryptosporidium antigens. Considered the gold standard for detection of this parasite in stool samples, polymerase chain reaction (PCR) is the most convenient method due to its lower cost, higher sensitivity, and higher specificity for identifying Cryptosporidium species.

== Epidemiology ==
=== Exposure risks ===
- People who swim regularly in pools with insufficient sanitation (certain strains of Cryptosporidium are chlorine-resistant)
- Child-care workers
- Parents of infected children
- People caring for other people with cryptosporidiosis
- Backpackers, hikers, and campers who drink unfiltered, untreated water
- People who visit petting farms and open farms with public access
- People, including swimmers, who swallow water from contaminated sources
- People handling infected cattle
- People exposed to human feces
- People who turn compost that has not gone through its phase where temperatures over 50 °C are reached

Dealing with stabilized compost – composting material that has gone through the phases where micro-organisms are digesting the organic matter and the temperature inside the composting pile has reached temperature up to 50–70 °C – poses very little risk as these temperatures kill pathogens and make oocysts unviable.

Like many fecal-oral pathogens, the disease can also be transmitted by contaminated food, poor hygiene or turning compost in a local compost site. Testing of water, as well as epidemiological study, are necessary to determine the sources of specific infections. Cryptosporidium typically does not cause serious illness in healthy people. It may chronically sicken some children, as well as adults exposed and immunocompromised.

== Species ==
- Cryptosporidium andersoni
- Cryptosporidium bailey
- Cryptosporidium bovis
- Cryptosporidium cervine
- Cryptosporidium canis
- Cryptosporidium cuniculus
- Cryptosporidium ducismarci
- Cryptosporidium fayeri
- Cryptosporidium felis
- Cryptosporidium fragile
- Cryptosporidium galli
- Cryptosporidium hominis
- Cryptosporidium marcopodum
- Cryptosporidium meleagridis
- Cryptosporidium molnari
- Cryptosporidium muris
- Cryptosporidium parvum
- Cryptosporidium ryanae
- Cryptosporidium saurophilum
- Cryptosporidium serpentis
- Cryptosporidium suis
- Cryptosporidium ubiquitum
- Cryptosporidium viatorum
- Cryptosporidium wrairi
- Cryptosporidium xiaoi

== See also ==
- 1987 Carroll County cryptosporidiosis outbreak
- 1993 Milwaukee cryptosporidiosis outbreak
- 1998 Sydney water crisis
- Escherichia coli
- Giardia lamblia
