= Egg hatch assay =

Method for determining a given parasite's resistance to extant drug therapy

Egg hatch assay (EHA), also called an egg hatch test (EHT), is a method used to determine a given parasite's resistance to extant drug therapy.

Fresh eggs are incubated from the parasite of interest and serial dilutions of the drug of interest are applied. The percentage of eggs that hatch or die is determined at each concentration and a drug response curve may be plotted. The data can then be transformed and analysed to give further statistics such as an effective dose.

This technique is labour-intensive, expensive and can take some time, but an egg hatch assay will give an accurate and reliable result.
