= 1987 Carroll County cryptosporidiosis outbreak =

Disease outbreak in Georgia, United States

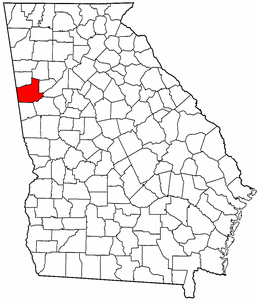
- Location of Carroll County within the state of Georgia
- Date: January 12–February 7, 1987
- Location: Carroll County, Georgia; 33.58°N 85.08°W
- Deaths: Cases / Deaths: (as at end of outbreak); ~13,000 / 0

The 1987 Carroll County cryptosporidiosis outbreak was a significant distribution of the Cryptosporidium protozoan in Carroll County, Georgia. Between January 12 and February 7, 1987, approximately 13,000 of the 65,000 residents of the county suffered intestinal illness caused by the Cryptosporidium parasite. Cryptosporidiosis is characterized by watery diarrhea, stomach cramps or pain, dehydration, nausea, vomiting and fever. Symptoms typically last for 1–4 weeks in immunocompetent individuals.

The parasite was found to have been transmitted through the public water supply. State health authorities were first alerted to the situation by Mary R. Miles, a health center physician at the University of West Georgia in Carrollton, Georgia.

A subsequent investigation by the Centers for Disease Control and Prevention (CDC) confirmed the presence of Cryptosporidium in water samples taken from the municipal water system on January 28, February 4 and February 5. Edward B. Hayes, the lead epidemiologist from CDC, was unable to pinpoint the source of the contamination but "suspected" it was either "infected cattle bathing in a river" that supplied Carrollton's water or a sewage spill later discovered near the municipal water treatment plant.

Dennis D. Juranek, also an epidemiologist at the CDC, observed that the treatment plant had at all times met the safe-water standards set by the Environmental Protection Agency (EPA) and questioned whether the standards were "tough enough to ensure that treatment plants snare passing microorganisms." Juranek said: "The Carrollton outbreak would seem to point out that if you're just meeting [EPA] standards, it's probably not adequate."

It is believed that removal of mechanical agitators at the flocculation stage resulted in the passage of particulates.

== See also ==
- 1993 Milwaukee Cryptosporidiosis outbreak
