= Cryptosporidium muris =

Scientific classification
- Domain: Eukaryota
- Clade: Sar
- Clade: Alveolata
- Phylum: Apicomplexa
- Class: Conoidasida
- Order: Eucoccidiorida
- Family: Cryptosporidiidae
- Genus: Cryptosporidium
- Species: C. muris

Binomial name
- Cryptosporidium muris Tyzzer, 1910

Species of single-celled organism

Cryptosporidium muris is a species of coccidium, first isolated from the gastric glands of the common mouse. Cryptosporidium does originate in common mice, specifically laboratory mice. However, it also has infected cows, dogs, cats, rats, rabbits, lambs, and humans and other primates.

== General characteristics ==
Cryptosporidium muris infects dogs, rabbits, lambs, cats, humans, and non-human primates. This type of cryptosporidium infects people and animals by the oocyst acquired in water. If people or animals drink the water, then they could become infected and then complete the cycle by passing oocysts. People and animals can also become infected by being in water that has the oocysts present. The area where Cryptosporidium muris most commonly occurs is in Kenya, France, Thailand, and Indonesia. It also occurs in the western hemisphere but to a far lower amount.

== Diagnostics and prevention ==
The current diagnostics for Cryptosporidium muris are Polymerase Chain Reaction (PCR), Restriction Fragment Length Polymorphism (RFLP), and DNA sequencing. Diagnostic tests can be frustrating as it is highly difficult to differentiate between species and the treatment would be the same for all species. Cryptosporidium muris is resistant to disinfectants; it has been discovered that ultraviolet or UV light helps to kill the species. As for prevention, people should not drink infected water or play in it. Also making sure to practice good hygiene improves the risks of not contracting Cryptosporidium.

== Prevalence ==
Cryptosporidium muris has prevalence in the following species in the following amount: Dairy Cows -68% Feedlot Cows- 80% Mice- 26%, and Rats- 5%.
