= Antiparasitic =

Class of medications

Antiparasitics are a class of medications which are indicated for the treatment of parasitic diseases, such as those caused by helminths, amoeba, ectoparasites, parasitic fungi, and protozoa, among others. Antiparasitics target the parasitic agents of the infections by destroying them or inhibiting their growth; they are usually effective against a limited number of parasites within a particular class. Antiparasitics are one of the antimicrobial drugs which include antibiotics that target bacteria, and antifungals that target fungi. They may be administered orally, intravenously or topically. Overuse or misuse of antiparasitics can lead to the development of antimicrobial resistance.

Broad-spectrum antiparasitics, analogous to broad-spectrum antibiotics for bacteria, are antiparasitic drugs with efficacy in treating a wide range of parasitic infections caused by parasites from different classes.

== Types ==
=== Broad-spectrum ===
- Nitazoxanide

=== Antiprotozoals ===
- Melarsoprol (for treatment of sleeping sickness caused by Trypanosoma brucei)
- Eflornithine (for sleeping sickness)
- Metronidazole (for vaginitis caused by Trichomonas)
- Tinidazole (for intestinal infections caused by Giardia lamblia)
- Miltefosine (for the treatment of visceral and cutaneous leishmaniasis, currently undergoing investigation for Chagas disease)

=== Antihelminthic ===
==== Antinematodes ====
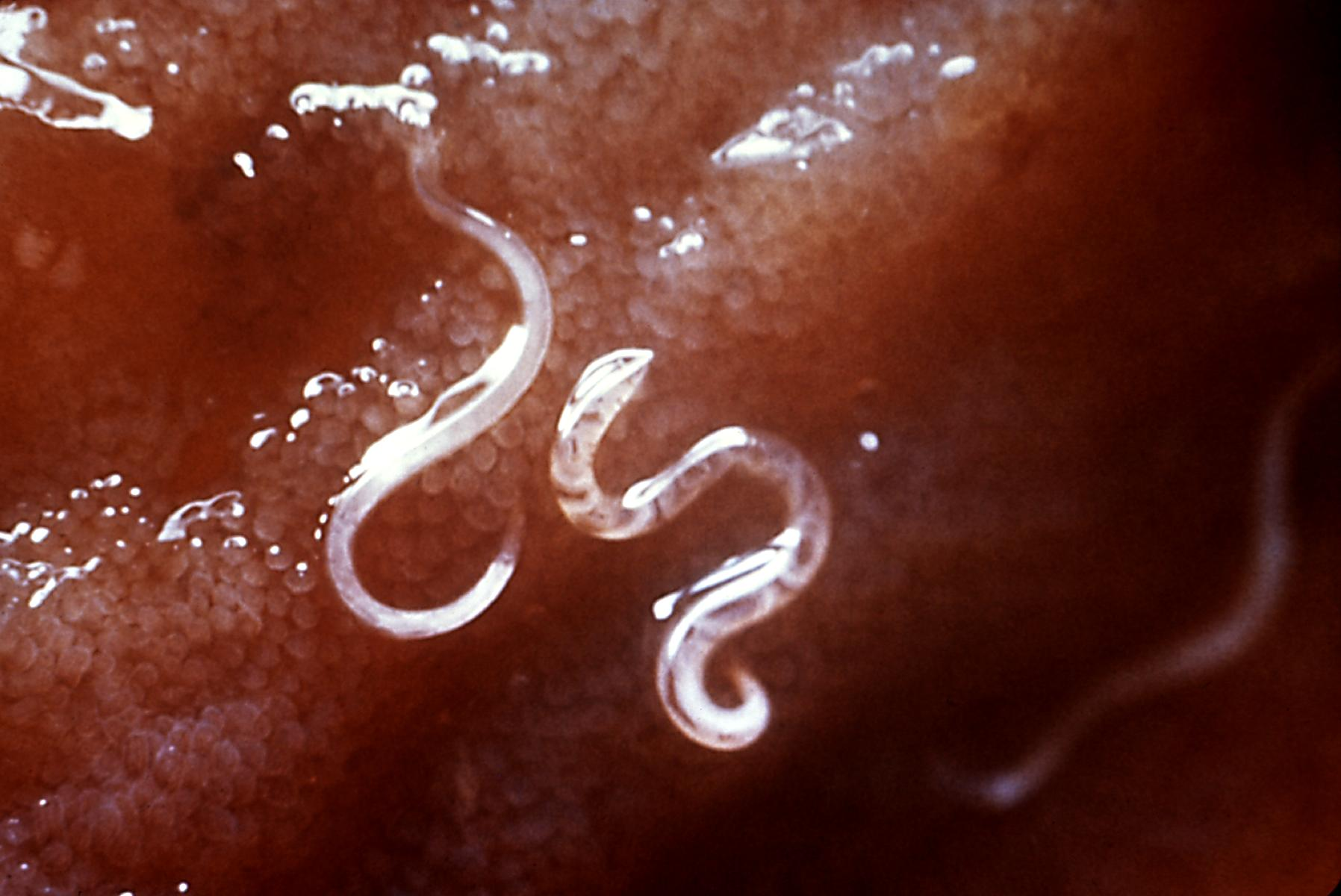
Ancylostoma caninum, a type of hookworm, attached to the intestinal mucosa.

- Mebendazole (for most nematode infections)
- Pyrantel pamoate (for most nematode infections)
- Thiabendazole (for roundworm infections)
- Diethylcarbamazine (for treatment of Lymphatic filariasis)
- Ivermectin (for prevention of river blindness)
- Fenbendazole

==== Anticestodes ====
- Niclosamide (for tapeworm infections)
- Praziquantel (for tapeworm infections)
- Albendazole (broad spectrum)

==== Antitrematodes ====
- Praziquantel

=== Antiamoebics ===
- Rifampin
- Amphotericin B

=== Antifungals ===
- Fumagillin (for microsporidiosis)

== Medical uses ==
Antiparasitics treat parasitic diseases, which impact an estimated 2 billion people.

=== Administration ===
Antiparastics may be given via a variety of routes depending on the specific medication, including oral, topical, and intravenous.

Resistance to antiparasitics has been a growing concern, especially in veterinary medicine. The Egg hatch assay can be used to determine whether a parasite causing an infection has become resistant to standard drug treatments.

== Drug development history ==
Early antiparasitics were ineffective, frequently toxic to patients, and difficult to administer due to the difficulty in distinguishing between the host and the parasite.

Between 1975 and 1999 only 13 of 1,300 new drugs were antiparasitics, which raised concerns that insufficient incentives existed to drive development of new treatments for diseases that disproportionately target low-income countries. This led to new public sector and public-private partnerships (PPPs), including investment by the Bill and Melinda Gates Foundation. Between 2000 and 2005, twenty new antiparasitic agents were developed or in development. Metal-containing compounds are the subject of another avenue of approach.

== Research ==
In the last decades, triazolopyrimidines and their metal complexes have been looked at as an alternative drug to the existing commercial antimonials, searching for a decrease in side effects and the development of parasite drug resistance.

== See also ==
- Balsam of Peru, which has antiparasitic attributes
- Naegleria fowleri
- Balamuthia mandrillaris
