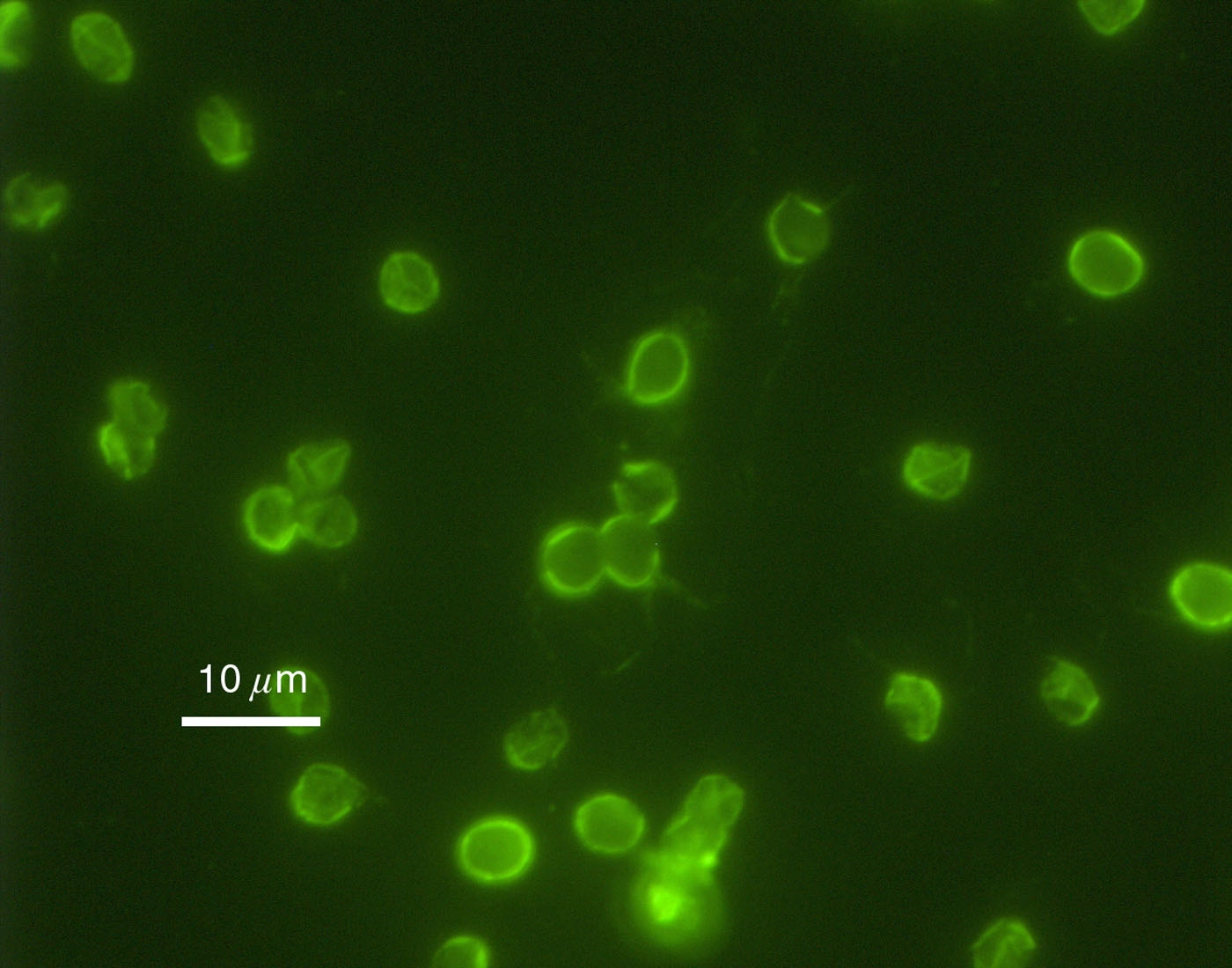
- Immunofluorescence image of C. parvum oocysts

Scientific classification
- Domain: Eukaryota
- Clade: Sar
- Clade: Alveolata
- Phylum: Apicomplexa
- Class: Conoidasida
- Order: Eucoccidiorida
- Family: Cryptosporidiidae
- Genus: Cryptosporidium
- Species: C. parvum

Binomial name
- Cryptosporidium parvum Tyzzer, 1912

= Cryptosporidium parvum =

Species of single-celled organism

Cryptosporidium parvum is one of several species of apicomplexan eukaryotes that cause cryptosporidiosis, a parasitic disease of the mammalian intestinal tract.

Primary symptoms of C. parvum infection are acute, watery, and nonbloody diarrhea. C. parvum infection is of particular concern in immunocompromised patients, where diarrhea can reach 10–15 times per day. Other symptoms may include anorexia, nausea/vomiting, and abdominal pain. Extra-intestinal sites include the lung, liver, and gall bladder, where it causes respiratory cryptosporidiosis, hepatitis, and cholecystitis, respectively.

Infection is caused by ingestion of sporulated oocysts transmitted by the faecal-oral route. In healthy human hosts, the median infective dose is 132 oocysts. The general C. parvum lifecycle is shared by other members of the genus. Invasion of the apical tip of ileal enterocytes by sporozoites and merozoites causes pathology seen in the disease.

Infection is generally self-limiting in immunocompetent people. In immunocompromised patients, such as those with AIDS or those undergoing immunosuppressive therapy, infection may not be self-limiting, leading to dehydration and, in severe cases, death.

== Detection ==
Cryptosporidium parvum oocysts are very difficult to detect; their small size means they are difficult to detect in fecal samples. A fecal ELISA could detect the presence of the parasite. A serological ELISA is unable to distinguish between past and present infections.

Cryptosporidium parvum is considered to be the most important waterborne pathogen in developed countries. The protozoa also caused the largest waterborne-disease outbreak ever documented in the United States, making 403,000 people ill in Milwaukee, Wisconsin, in 1993. It is resistant to all practical levels of chlorination, surviving for 24 hours at 1000 mg/L free chlorine. It is an obligate intracellular pathogen.

== Prevention ==
The most effective way to prevent the spread of C. parvum is to avoid contact with contaminated feces. Avoiding this contact, especially with young children, is important, as they are more likely to come into oral contact and have the parasite transferred into the body. Hygiene is the most effective way to combat this difficult-to-prevent parasite. Those visiting areas, such as petting zoos, where they might access affected animals should ensure good hygiene measures such as hand washing.

== Oocyst stage ==
The C. parvum oocysts are incredibly durable, which can cause extended problems when attempting to control the spread of the parasite. The oocyst stage can tolerate a vast number of environmental pressures. The oocyst can tolerate temperatures as low as −22 °C and for long periods of time, which means fecal contamination is possible even after going through deep freezing. The oocysts can also tolerate shifts in pH that are found in some water treatment processes, and careful attention to detail must be done to prevent the possibility of infection. The oocysts in fecal material are immediately infective and have the potential to find a new host if contamination occurs.

== Genome ==
The genome of C. parvum (sequenced in 2004) is of relatively small size and simple organization of 9.1 Mb, which is composed of eight chromosomes ranging from 1.04 to 1.5 Mb. The genome is very compact, and is one of the few organisms without transposable elements. Unlike other apicomplexans, C. parvum has no genes in its plastids or mitochondria.

== Treatment ==
Treatment of gastrointestinal infection in humans involves fluid rehydration, electrolyte replacement, and management of any pain. As of January 2015, nitazoxanide is the only drug approved for the treatment of cryptosporidiosis in immunocompetent hosts. Paromomycin may alleviate some of the diarrhoeal symptoms and is registered for it in UK for non-ruminating calves (Parofor Crypto, Huvepharma). Continuing antiretroviral drugs for HIV infection to boost the immune system may also control infection.

== Important C. parvum proteins and drug targets ==
=== Lipid metabolism ===
C. parvum is incapable of de novo lipid synthesis, making its lipid trafficking machinery an important potential therapeutic target. C. parvum possesses multiple oxysterol-binding proteins (OSBPs), and oxysterol related proteins (OSRPs). Only OSBPs are capable of lipid binding, while both contain Pleckstrin homology domains, which function in cell signalling pathways.

=== Surface glycoproteins ===
Cryptosporidium parvum possesses numerous surface glycoproteins thought to play a role in pathogenesis. An immunodominant >900 kDa protein, known as GP900, localizes to the apical end of sporozoites and in micronemes of merozoites. Its high molecular mass is most likely due to heavy post-translational glycosylation. Indeed, the structure of GP900 is similar to that of a family of glycoproteins known as mucins. GP900 is thought to mediate attachment and invasion to host cells. GP900 may also play a role in C. parvum's resistance to proteolysis by the numerous proteases found in the mammalian gut.

In vitro, hyperimmune sera, as well as antibodies directed at specific epitopes on the GP900 protein, inhibit the invasion of C. parvum sporozoites into MDCK cell monolayers. Additionally, competitive inhibition using native GP900 or purified GP900 fragments reduces cell invasion.

Further experiments have confirmed the importance of the mucin-like glycosylations. Lectins directed at GP900 carbohydrate moieties (alpha-N-galactosamine) were able to block adhesion and prevent C. parvum invasion.

Cryptosporidium parvum glycoproteins have the characteristics of attractive vaccine candidates. Many are immunodominant, and antibodies against select domains block invasion of host cells.
