= Cryptosporidiosis =

Parasitic disease

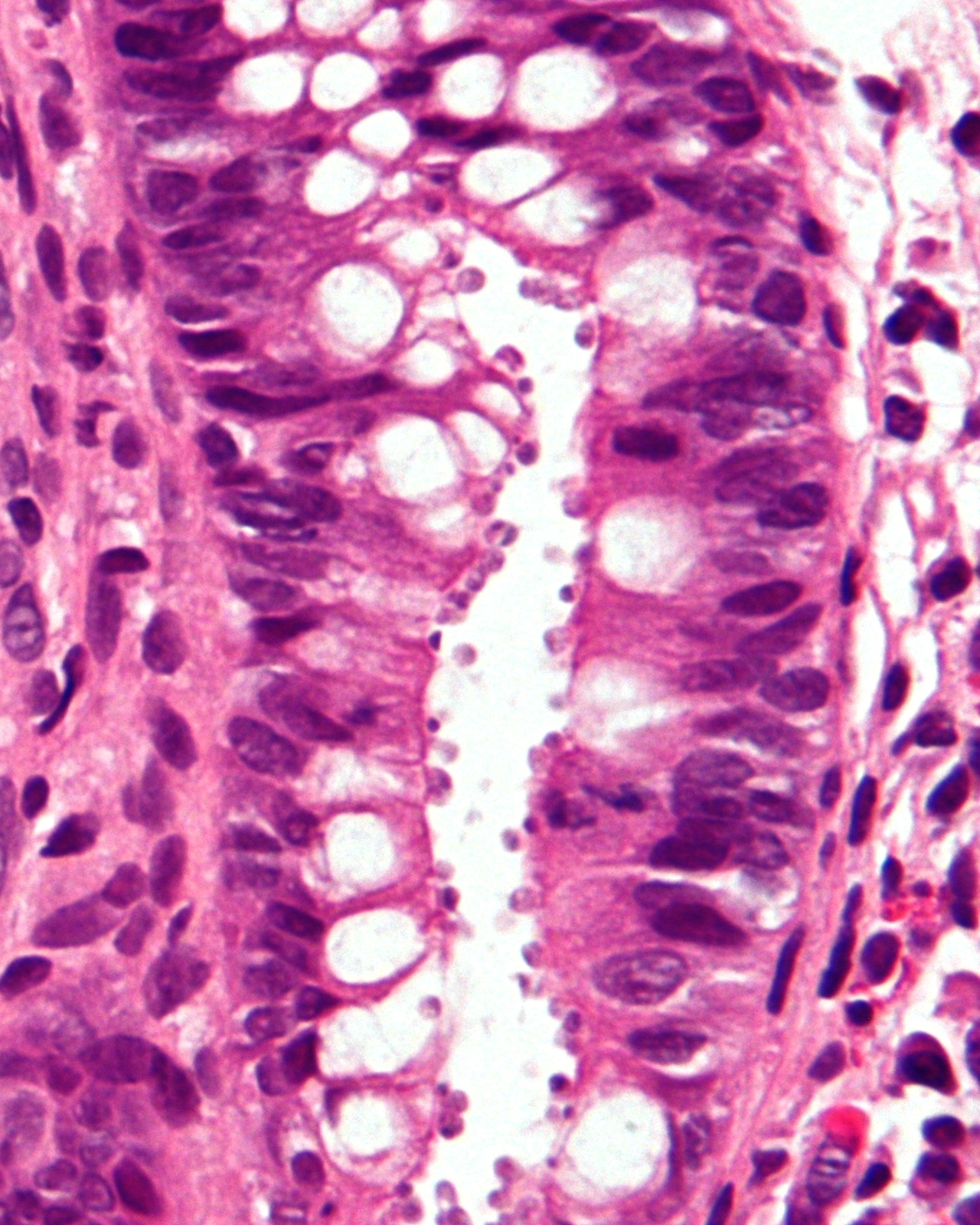
- Micrograph showing cryptosporidiosis. The cryptosporidium are the small, round bodies in apical vacuoles on the surface of the epithelium. H&E stain. Colonic biopsy.
- Specialty: Infectious disease
- Symptoms: Watery diarrhea, nausea, abdominal pain, fever
- Causes: Cryptosporidium infection
- Risk factors: Immunocompromisation
- Prevention: Avoid contaminated water
- Treatment: Nitazoxanide

Cryptosporidiosis, sometimes informally called crypto, is a parasitic disease caused by Cryptosporidium, a genus of protozoan parasites in the phylum Apicomplexa. It affects the distal small intestine and can affect the respiratory tract in both immunocompetent (i.e., individuals with a normal functioning immune system) and immunocompromised (e.g., persons with HIV/AIDS or autoimmune disorders) individuals, resulting in watery diarrhea with or without an unexplained cough. In immunosuppressed individuals, the symptoms are particularly severe and can be fatal. It is primarily spread through the fecal-oral route, often through contaminated water; recent evidence suggests that it can also be transmitted via fomites contaminated with respiratory secretions. Cryptosporidium is commonly isolated in HIV-positive patients presenting with diarrhea.

The organism was first described in 1907 by Tyzzer, who recognised it was a coccidian.

On January 8, 2025, a group of scientists from the Cryptosporidiosis Therapeutics Advocacy Group (CTAG) released an article in the newsletter Global Health NOW advocating for Cryptosporidiosis to be raised to the status of Neglected Tropical Disease (NTD) by the World Health Organization (WHO).

== Signs and symptoms ==
Cryptosporidiosis may occur as an asymptomatic infection, an acute infection (i.e., duration shorter than 2 weeks), as recurrent acute infections in which symptoms reappear following a brief period of recovery for up to 30 days, and as a chronic infection (i.e., duration longer than 2 weeks) in which symptoms are severe and persistent. It may be fatal in individuals with a severely compromised immune system. Symptoms usually appear 5–10 days after infection (range: 2–28 days) and normally last for up to 2 weeks in immunocompetent individuals; symptoms are usually more severe and persist longer in immunocompromised individuals. Following the resolution of diarrhea, symptoms can reoccur after several days or weeks due to reinfection. The likelihood of re-infection is high in immunocompromised adults, and low in those with normal immune systems.

In immunocompetent individuals, cryptosporidiosis is primarily localized to the distal small intestine and sometimes the respiratory tract as well. In immunocompromised persons, cryptosporidiosis may disseminate to other organs, including the hepatobiliary system, pancreas, upper gastrointestinal tract, and urinary bladder; pancreatic and biliary infection can involve acalculous cholecystitis, sclerosing cholangitis, papillary stenosis, or pancreatitis.

=== Intestinal cryptosporidiosis ===
Common signs and symptoms of intestinal cryptosporidiosis include:

- Moderate to severe watery diarrhea, sometimes contains mucus and rarely contains blood or leukocytes
  - In very severe cases, diarrhea may be profuse and cholera-like with malabsorption and hypovolemia
- Low-grade fever
- Crampy abdominal pain
- Dehydration
- Weight loss
- Fatigue
- Nausea and vomiting – suggests upper GI tract involvement and may lead to respiratory cryptosporidiosis
- Epigastric or right upper quadrant tenderness

Less common or rare signs and symptoms include:

- Reactive arthritis (may affect the hands, knees, ankles, and feet)
- Jaundice – suggests hepatobiliary involvement
- Ascites – suggests pancreatic involvement

=== Respiratory cryptosporidiosis ===
Symptoms of upper respiratory cryptosporidiosis include:

- Inflammation of the nasal mucosa, sinuses, larynx, or trachea
- Nasal discharge
- Voice change (e.g., hoarseness)

Symptoms of lower respiratory cryptosporidiosis include:

- Cough
- Shortness of breath
- Fever
- Hypoxemia

== Cause ==
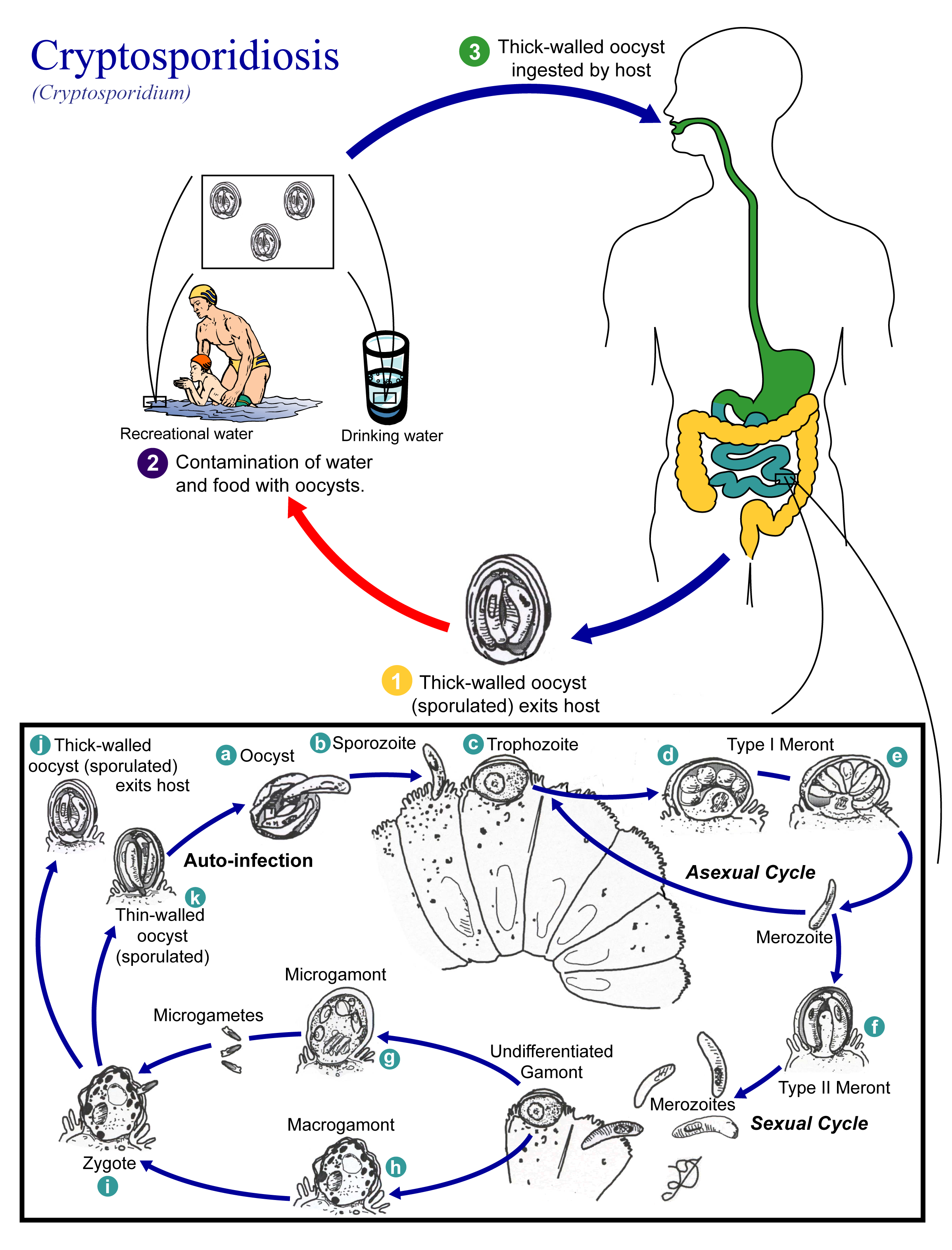
Life cycle of Cryptosporidium spp.

Cryptosporidium is a genus of protozoan pathogens which is categorized under the phylum Apicomplexa. Other apicomplexan pathogens include the malaria parasite Plasmodium, and Toxoplasma, the causative agent of toxoplasmosis. Several Cryptosporidium species infect mammals. In humans, the main causes of disease are C. parvum and C. hominis (previously C. parvum genotype 1). C. canis, C. felis, C. meleagridis, and C. muris can also cause disease in humans. Cryptosporidium is capable of completing its life cycle within a single host, resulting in microbial cyst stages that are excreted in feces and are capable of transmission to a new host via the fecal-oral route. Other vectors of disease transmission also exist.

The pattern of Cryptosporidium life cycle fits well with that of other intestinal homogeneous coccidian genera of the suborder Eimeriina: macro- and microgamonts develop independently; a microgamont gives rise to numerous male gametes; and oocysts serve for parasites' spreading in the environment. Electron microscopic studies made from the 1970s have shown the intracellular, although extracytoplasmic localization of Cryptosporidium species.

These species possess several unusual features:

- an endogenous phase of development in microvilli of epithelial surfaces
- two morphofunctional types of oocysts
- the smallest number of sporozoites per oocyst
- a multi-membraneous "feeder" organelle

DNA studies suggest a relationship with the gregarines rather than the coccidia. The taxonomic position of this group has not yet been finally agreed upon.

The genome of Cryptosporidium parvum was sequenced in 2004 and was found to be unusual amongst Eukaryotes in that the mitochondria seem not to contain DNA. A closely related species, C. hominis, also has its genome sequence available. CryptoDB.org is a NIH-funded database that provides access to the Cryptosporidium genomics data sets.

=== Transfer ===
Infection is through contaminated material such as earth, water, uncooked or cross-contaminated food that has been in contact with the feces of an infected individual or animal. Contact must then be transferred to the mouth and swallowed. It is especially prevalent amongst those in regular contact with bodies of fresh water, including recreational water such as swimming pools. Other potential sources include insufficiently treated water supplies, contaminated food, or exposure to feces. The high resistance of Cryptosporidium oocysts to disinfectants such as chlorine bleach enables them to survive for long periods and remain infective. Some outbreaks have happened in day care related to diaper changes.

The following groups have an elevated risk of being exposed to Cryptosporidium:

- Child care workers
- Parents of infected children
- People who take care of other people with cryptosporidiosis
- International travelers
- Backpackers, hikers, and campers who drink unfiltered, untreated water
- People, including swimmers, who swallow water from contaminated sources
- People who handle infected cattle
- People exposed to human feces through sexual contact

Cases of cryptosporidiosis can occur even in cities that have a properly decontaminated water supply. In a city with clean water, it may be that cases of cryptosporidiosis have other origins. Testing of water, as well as epidemiological study, is necessary to determine the sources of specific infections. Cryptosporidium causes serious illness more frequently in immunocompromised than in apparently healthy individuals. It may chronically sicken some children, as well as adults who are exposed and immunocompromised. A subset of the immunocompromised population is people with AIDS. Some sexual behaviors can transmit the parasite.

Agricultural transmission

Cryptosporidiosis can occur in agricultural environments where humans have close contact with livestock and contaminated water sources. The parasite Cryptosporidium is shed in the feces of infected animals, particularly young calves, and the infectious oocysts can contaminate soil and surface water. Humans may become infected through direct contact with infected animals or through ingestion of contaminated drinking water or food. Agricultural runoff and improper manure management may contribute to environmental contamination, increasing the risk of transmission to nearby communities.

=== Life cycle ===
Cryptosporidium spp. exist as multiple cell types which correspond to different stages in an infection (e.g., a sexual and asexual stage). As an oocyst – a type of hardy, thick-walled spore – it can survive in the environment for months and is resistant to many common disinfectants, particularly chlorine-based disinfectants. After being ingested, the sporozoites within oocysts excyst (i.e., are released) in the small intestine. The released sporozoites subsequently attach to the microvilli of the epithelial cells of the small intestine. From there, they become trophozoites that reproduce asexually by multiple fission, a process known as schizogony. The trophozoites develop into Type 1 meronts [1] that contain 8 daughter cells.

These daughter cells are Type 1 merozoites, which are released by the meronts. Some of these merozoites can cause autoinfection by attaching to epithelial cells. Others of these merozoites become Type II meronts, which contain 4 Type II merozoites. These merozoites get released and they attach to the epithelial cells. From there, they become either macrogamonts or microgamonts. These are the female and male sexual forms, respectively. This stage, when sexual forms arise, is called gametogony.

Zygotes are formed by microgametes from the microgamont penetrating the macrogamonts. The zygotes develop into two types of oocysts. 20% of oocysts have thin walls and so can reinfect the host by rupturing and releasing sporozoites that start the process over again. The thick-walled oocysts are excreted into the environment. The oocysts are mature and infective upon being excreted.

== Pathogenesis ==
The oocysts are ovoid or spherical and measure 5 to 6 micrometers across. When in flotation preparations, they appear highly refractile. The oocysts contain up to 4 sporozoites that are bow-shaped.

As few as 2 to 10 oocysts can initiate an infection. The parasite is located in the brush border of the epithelial cells of the small intestine. They are mainly located in the jejunum. When the sporozoites attach to the epithelial cells' membrane envelops them. Thus, they are "intracellular but extracytoplasmic". The parasite can cause damage to the microvilli where it attaches. The infected human excretes the most oocysts during the first week. Oocysts can be excreted for weeks after the diarrhea subsides from infections by C. parvum or C. hominis; however, immunocompetent individuals with C. muris infections have been observed excreting oocysts for seven months.

The immune system reduces the formation of Type 1 merozoites as well as the number of thin-walled oocysts. This helps prevent autoinfection. B cells do not help with the initial response or the fight to eliminate the parasite. Previous infection in immunocompetent individuals produces little resistance to future infection; however, it may decrease the severity of disease and the number of oocysts excreted.

== Diagnosis ==
There are many diagnostic tests for Cryptosporidium. They include microscopy, staining, and detection of antibodies. Microscopy can help identify oocysts in fecal matter. To increase the chance of finding the oocysts, the diagnostician should inspect at least 3 stool samples. There are several techniques to concentrate either the stool sample or the oocysts. The modified formalin-ethyl acetate (FEA) concentration method concentrates the stool. Both the modified zinc sulfate centrifugal flotation technique and the Sheather's sugar flotation procedure can concentrate the oocysts by causing them to float. Another form of microscopy is fluorescent microscopy done by staining with auramine.

Other staining techniques include acid-fast staining, which will stain the oocysts red. One type of acid-fast stain is the Kinyoun stain. Giemsa staining can also be performed. Part of the small intestine can be stained with hematoxylin and eosin (H & E), which will show oocysts attached to the epithelial cells.

Detecting antigens is yet another way to diagnose the disease. This can be done with direct fluorescent antibody (DFA) techniques. It can also be achieved through indirect immunofluorescence assay. Enzyme-linked immunosorbent assay (ELISA) also detects antigens.

Polymerase chain reaction (PCR) is another way to diagnose cryptosporidiosis. It can even identify the specific species of Cryptosporidium. If the patient is thought to have biliary cryptosporidiosis, then an appropriate diagnostic technique is ultrasonography. If that returns normal results, the next step would be to perform endoscopic retrograde cholangiopancreatography.

== Prevention ==
Many treatment plants that take raw water from rivers, lakes, and reservoirs for public drinking water production use conventional filtration technologies. This involves a series of processes, including coagulation, flocculation, sedimentation, and filtration. Direct filtration, which is typically used to treat water with low particulate levels, includes coagulation and filtration, but not sedimentation. Other common filtration processes, including slow sand filters, diatomaceous earth filters, and membranes will remove 99% of Cryptosporidium. Membranes and bag and cartridge filters remove Cryptosporidium product-specifically.

While Cryptosporidium is highly resistant to chlorine disinfection, with high enough concentrations and contact time, Cryptosporidium will be inactivated by chlorine dioxide and ozone treatment. The required levels of chlorine generally preclude the use of chlorine disinfection as a reliable method to control Cryptosporidium in drinking water. Ultraviolet light treatment at relatively low doses will inactivate Cryptosporidium. Water Research Foundation-funded research originally discovered UV's efficacy in inactivating Cryptosporidium.

One of the largest challenges in identifying outbreaks is the ability to identify Cryptosporidium in the laboratory. Real-time monitoring technology is now able to detect Cryptosporidium with online systems, unlike the spot and batch testing methods used in the past.

The most reliable way to decontaminate drinking water that may be contaminated by Cryptosporidium is to boil it.

In the US the law requires doctors and labs to report cases of cryptosporidiosis to local or state health departments. These departments then report to the Centers for Disease Control and Prevention. The best way to prevent getting and spreading cryptosporidiosis is to have good hygiene and sanitation. An example would be hand-washing. Prevention is through washing hands carefully after going to the bathroom or contacting stool, and before eating. People should avoid contact with animal feces. They should also avoid possibly contaminated food and water. In addition, people should refrain from engaging in sexual activities that can expose them to feces.

Standard water filtration may not be enough to eliminate Cryptosporidium; boiling for at least 1 minute (3 minutes above 6,500 feet (2,000 m) of altitude) will decontaminate it. Heating milk at 71.7 °C (161 °F) for 15 seconds pasteurizes it and can destroy the oocysts' ability to infect. Water can also be made safe by filtering with a filter with pore size not greater than 1 micrometre, or by filters that have been approved for "cyst removal" by NSF International National Sanitation Foundation. Bottled drinking water is less likely to contain Cryptosporidium, especially if the water is from an underground source.

People with cryptosporidiosis should not swim in communal areas because the pathogen can reside in the anal and genital areas and be washed off. They should wait until at least two weeks after diarrhea stops before entering public water sources, since oocysts can still be shed for a while. Also, they should stay away from immunosuppressed people. Immunocompromised people should take care to protect themselves from water in lakes and streams. They should also stay away from animal stools and wash their hands after touching animals. To be safe, they should boil or filter their water. They should also wash and cook their vegetables.

The US CDC notes the recommendation of many public health departments to soak contaminated surfaces for 20 minutes with a 3% hydrogen peroxide (99% kill rate) and then rinse them thoroughly, with the caveat that no disinfectant is guaranteed to be completely effective against Cryptosporidium. However, hydrogen peroxide is more effective than standard bleach solutions.

Prevention in agricultural settings

Prevention of Cryptosporidiosis involves improved sanitation, proper management of animal waste, and protection of drinking water sources. Individuals who work with livestock are encouraged to practice hand hygiene after handling animals or manure. Public health agencies also recommend avoiding untreated surface water in areas where livestock may contaminate water sources. Water treatment processes such as filtration and ultraviolet disinfection can help reduce the presence of Cryptosporidium in drinking water supplies.

== Treatment ==
Symptomatic treatment primarily involves fluid rehydration, electrolyte replacement (sodium, potassium, bicarbonate, and glucose), and antimotility agents (e.g., loperamide). Supplemental zinc may improve symptoms, particularly in recurrent or persistent infections or in others at risk for zinc deficiency.

=== Immunocompetent ===
Immunocompetent individuals with cryptosporidiosis typically experience a short (i.e., duration of less than 2 weeks) self-limiting course of diarrhea that may require symptomatic treatment and ends with spontaneous recovery; in some circumstances, antiparasitic medication may be required (e.g., recurrent, severe, or persistent symptoms); however reinfection frequently occurs.

As of 2015, nitazoxanide is the only antiparasitic drug treatment with proven efficacy for cryptosporidiosis in immunocompetent individuals; however, it lacks efficacy in severely immunocompromised patients. Certain agents such as paromomycin and azithromycin are sometimes used as well, but they only have partial efficacy.

=== Immunocompromised ===
In immunocompromised individuals, such as AIDS patients, cryptosporidiosis resolves slowly or not at all. It frequently causes a particularly severe and persistent form of watery diarrhea coupled with a greatly decreased ability to absorb key nutrients through the intestinal tract. As a result, infected individuals may experience severe dehydration, electrolyte imbalances, malnutrition, wasting, and potentially death. In general, the mortality rate for infected AIDS patients is based on CD4+ marker counts. Patients with CD4+ counts over 180 cells/mm^{3} recover with supportive hospital care and medication; but, in patients with CD4+ counts below 50 cells/mm^{3}, the effects are usually fatal within 3 to 6 months. During the 1993 Milwaukee cryptosporidiosis outbreak (the largest of its kind), 73% of AIDS patients with CD4+ counts lower than 50 cells/mm^{3} and 36% of those with counts between 50 and 200 cells/mm^{3} died within the first year of contracting the infection.

In individuals with HIV and cryptosporidiosis, the primary treatment is the prompt initiation of effective antiretroviral therapy (ART) to restore immune function, typically using an integrase strand transfer inhibitor (INSTI)–based regimen rather than older protease-inhibitor combinations (National Institutes of Health, 2025). Restoration of immune competence is the single most important factor in clearing infection.

Supportive care—including hydration, nutritional maintenance, and symptom control—is essential. Nitazoxanide may be considered as an adjunct, although its benefit in immunocompromised individuals remains limited, and clinical studies have shown reduced or absent efficacy in patients with advanced HIV (Centers for Disease Control and Prevention [CDC], 2025a). Evidence for other antiparasitic agents such as paromomycin or azithromycin is inconclusive; none have demonstrated consistent benefit in people with severe immune suppression (CDC, 2025b).

Older reviews, such as the Cochrane Collaboration analysis, noted potential activity of nitazoxanide primarily in immunocompetent hosts and regarded its use in immunocompromised individuals as experimental or adjunctive rather than standard therapy. Current guidelines emphasize that immune reconstitution through ART, not antiparasitic drug therapy, remains the cornerstone of management.

Currently, research is being done in molecular-based immunotherapy. For example, synthetic isoflavone derivatives have been shown to fight off Cryptosporidium parvum both in vitro and in animal studies. Derivates of nitazoxanide, known as thiazolides, have also shown promising results in vitro. rifaximin is also sometimes used for immunocompromised patients/patients with severe disease.

== Epidemiology ==
Cryptosporidiosis is found worldwide. It causes 50.8% of water-borne diseases that are attributed to parasites. In developing countries, 8–19% of diarrheal diseases can be attributed to Cryptosporidium. Ten percent of the population in developing countries excretes oocysts. In developed countries, the number is lower at 1–3%. The age group most affected is children from 1 to 9 years old.

In Eastern Europe, cryptosporidiosis in humans and animals is common, but there are considerable gaps in surveillance and a lack of comparable methods, which limit the understanding of the disease and the detection of outbreaks. Research shows a rich diversity of zoonotic subtypes of the parasite in animals, indicating a rich potential of animal-to-human transmission. For example, the subtype IId of C. parvum is considered highly virulent compared to subtype IIa of the same species. Subtype IId caused severe damage to intestinal epithelial barrier and pathological changes in a study done with neonatal mice. In addition, the oocyst shedding window was wider and the infection period was longer in subtype IId compared to subtype IIa.

Roughly 30% of adults in the United States are seropositive for cryptosporidiosis, meaning that they contracted the infection at some point in their lives.

== Research ==
A recombinant Cryptosporidium parvum oocyst surface protein (rCP15/60) vaccine has produced an antibody response in a large group of cows and also an antibody response in calves fed rCP15/60-immune colostrum produced by these vaccinated cows. This is very promising. Human Cryptosporidium parvum infections are particularly prevalent and often fatal in infants in developing countries and to immunocompromised people, such as AIDS patients. There is no commercially available effective vaccine against Cryptosporidium parvum, although passive immunization utilizing different zoite surface (glyco)proteins has shown promise. Developmental stages of the life cycle of the parasite might act as possible targets for vaccine development. The organism is detected in 65–97% of the surface-water supply in the United States and is resistant to most disinfectants used for the treatment of drinking water. Antibodies in the serum of humans and animals infected with Cryptosporidium parvum react with several antigens, one of which is a 15 kDa protein (CP15) located on the surface of the organism. This protein is a good candidate for use as a molecular vaccine because previous studies have shown that a monoclonal antibody to CP15 confers passive immunity to mice. Currently, there is no vaccine or completely effective drug therapy against Cryptosporidium parvum in HIV/AIDS individuals.

A summary of discoveries presented at the June 2019 international symposium on Cryptosporidium was published in 2020.

== In animals ==
The most important zoonotic reservoirs are cattle, sheep and goats. In addition, in recent years, cryptosporidiosis has plagued many commercial leopard gecko breeders. Several species of the Cryptosporidium family (C. serpentes and others) are involved, and outside of geckos it has been found in monitor lizards, iguanas and tortoises, as well as several snake species.

== Notable cases ==
=== Before 2000 ===
- In 1987, 13,000 people in Carrollton, Georgia, United States, became ill with cryptosporidiosis. This was the first report of its spread through a municipal water system that met all state and federal drinking water standards.
- In 1993, a waterborne cryptosporidiosis outbreak occurred in Milwaukee, Wisconsin, US. An estimated 403,000 people became ill, including 4,400 people hospitalized. The source of the Cryptosporidium is believed to be overflow from the Milwaukee area combined sanitary and storm sewer system into Lake Michigan, which was then taken into the Howard Avenue Water Purification Plant and distributed to an estimated 880,000 residents (of the 1.61 million residents in the Milwaukee area who receive their drinking water from Lake Michigan). These residents, who receive their drinking water from Lake Michigan, were told to boil their water before drinking it. More people were affected in this one outbreak than the combined number of people affected in every cryptosporidiosis outbreak in the 24 years since then. An estimated 69 people died during the outbreak, according to the CDC.
- The UK's biggest outbreak occurred in Torbay in Devon in 1995.
- In the summer of 1996, Cryptosporidium affected approximately 2,000 people in Cranbrook, British Columbia, Canada. Weeks later, a separate incident occurred in Kelowna, British Columbia, where 10,000 to 15,000 people got sick.

=== 2001–2009 ===
- In April 2001, an outbreak occurred in the city of North Battleford, Saskatchewan, Canada. Between 5800 and 7100 people had diarrheal illness, and 1,907 cases of cryptosporidiosis were confirmed. Equipment failures at the city's antiquated water filtration plant following maintenance were found to have caused the outbreak.
- In the summer of 2005, after numerous reports by patrons of gastrointestinal upset, a water park at Seneca Lake State Park, in the Finger Lakes region of upstate New York was found to have two water storage tanks infected with Cryptosporidium. By early September 2005, over 3,800 people reported symptoms of a Cryptosporidium infection. The "Sprayground" was ordered closed for the season on 15 August.
- In October 2005, the Gwynedd and Anglesey areas of North Wales, the United Kingdom, had an outbreak of cryptosporidiosis. The outbreak may have been linked to the drinking water supply from Llyn Cwellyn, but this is not yet confirmed. As a result, 231 people fell ill, and the company Welsh Water (Dwr Cymru) advised 61,000 people to boil their water before use.
- In March 2007, a suspected outbreak occurred in Galway, Ireland, after the source of water for much of the county, Lough Corrib, was suspected to be contaminated with the parasite. A large population (90,000 people), including areas of both Galway City and County, was advised to boil water for drinking, food preparation, and brushing teeth. On 21 March 2007, it was confirmed that the city and county's water supply was contaminated with the parasite. The area's water supply was finally approved on 20 August 2007, five months after Cryptosporidium was first detected. Around 240 people are known to have contracted the disease; experts say the true figure could be up to 5,000.
- Hundreds of public pools in 20 Utah counties were closed to young children in 2007, as children under 5 are most likely to spread the disease, especially children wearing diapers. As of 10 September 2007, the Utah Department of Health had reported 1302 cases of cryptosporidiosis in the year; a more usual number would be 30. On 25 September, the pools were reopened to those not requiring diapers, but hyperchlorination requirements were not lifted.
- On 21 September 2007, a Cryptosporidium outbreak attacked the Western United States: 230 Idaho residents, with hundreds across the Rocky Mountain area; in the Boise and Meridian areas; Utah, 1,600 illnesses; Colorado and other Western states — Montana, decrease.
- On 25 June 2008, Cryptosporidium was found in England in water supplies in Northampton, Daventry, and some surrounding areas supplied from the Pitsford Reservoir, as reported on the BBC. People in the affected areas were warned not to drink tap water unless it had been boiled. Anglian Water confirmed that 108,000 households were affected, about 250,000 people. They advised that water might not be fit for human consumption for many weeks. The boil notice was lifted for all the affected customers on 4 July 2008.
- Throughout the summer of 2008; many public swimming areas, water parks, and public pools in the Dallas/Fort Worth Metroplex of Texas had an outbreak of cryptosporidiosis. Burger's Lake in Fort Worth was the first to report such an outbreak. This prompted some, if not all, city-owned and private pools to close and hyperchlorinate. To the 13 August 2008, there were 400 reported cases of Cryptosporidium.
- In September 2008, a gym in Cambridge, the United Kingdom, was forced to close its swimming pool until further notice after health inspectors found an outbreak of cryptosporidiosis. Environmental Health authorities requested that the water be tested after it was confirmed that a young man had been infected.

=== Since 2010 ===
- In May 2010, the Behana creek water supply south of Cairns, Australia, was found to be contaminated by cryptosporidium.
- In July 2010, a local sports center in Cumbernauld (east of Glasgow, UK) detected traces of cryptosporidium in its swimming pools, causing a temporary closure of the swimming pools.
- In November 2010, over 4000 cases of cryptosporidiosis were reported in Östersund, Sweden. The source of contamination was the tap water. In mid December 2010 the number of reported cases was 12,400 according to local media.
- As of April 2011, there has been an ongoing outbreak in Skellefteå, Sweden. Although many people have been diagnosed with cryptosporidiosis, the source of the parasite has not yet been found. Several tests have been taken around the water treatment unit "Abborren", but so far, no results have turned up positive. Residents are being advised to boil the tap water as they continue to search for the contaminating source.
- Since May 2011, there has been an ongoing outbreak in South Roscommon in Ireland. Although many people have been diagnosed with cryptosporidiosis, the source of the parasite has not yet been found. Testing continues, and the Roscommon County Council is now considering introducing Ultraviolet Filtration to their water treatment process in the next 12 months. Residents are being advised to boil the tap water, and there is no sign of this boil notice being lifted in the near future.
- In May 2013, in Roscommon, Ireland, another outbreak of cryptosporidiosis was reported, and a boil water notice was issued. This was the second time the parasite was detected in a month in the Roscommon water supply. The source of one of the outbreaks had been linked to the agricultural community. At least 13 people were treated for Cryptosporidiosis.
- In September 2023, in Queenstown, New Zealand, there was an outbreak reported, and a boil water notice was issued a day after it was discovered. A link has been made to possible human fecal contamination. More than 60 people were treated for Cryptosporidiosis.
- In May 2024, in Devon, United Kingdom, there was an outbreak with hundreds of cases, and South West Water (SWW) had to issue a boil notice to 16,000 households and businesses in Brixham, Boohay, Kingswear, Roseland, and North West Paignton. A damaged air valve on a farm which had never been inspected and illegal "cross connections" between safe drinking water and water unfit for human consumption were considered likely to have allowed animal waste or contaminated groundwater to enter the water supply. SWW was said to have failed in its most basic duty; the company pleaded guilty to a criminal offence and was fined £1.85 million in 2026.
