= Discovery of disease-causing pathogens =

Aspect of history

The discovery of disease-causing pathogens is an important activity in the field of medical science. Many viruses, bacteria, protozoa, fungi, helminths (parasitic worms), and prions are identified as a confirmed or potential pathogen. In the United States, a Centers for Disease Control and Prevention program, begun in 1995, identified over a hundred patients with life-threatening illnesses that were considered to be of an infectious cause but that could not be linked to a known pathogen. The association of pathogens with disease can be a complex and controversial process, in some cases requiring decades or even centuries to achieve.

== Factors impairing identification of pathogens ==
Factors which have been identified as impeding the identification of pathogens include the following:

1. Lack of animal models: Experimental infection in animals has been used as a criterion to demonstrate a disease-causing ability, but for some pathogens (such as Vibrio cholerae, which causes disease only in humans), animal models do not exist. In cases where animal models were not available, scientists have sometimes infected themselves or others to determine an organism's disease causing ability.

2. Pre-existing theories of disease: Before a pathogen is well-recognized, scientists may attribute the symptoms of infection to other causes, such as toxicological, psychological, or genetic causes. Once a pathogen has been associated with an illness, researchers have reported difficulty displacing these pre-existing theories.

3. Variable pathogenicity: Infection with pathogens can produce varying responses in hosts, complicating the process of showing a relationship between infection and the pathogen. In some infectious diseases, the severity of symptoms has been shown to be dependent on specific genetic traits of the host.

4. Organisms that look alike but behave differently: In some cases a harmless organism exists which looks identical to a disease causing organism with a microscope, which complicates the discovery process.

5. Lack of research effort: Slow progress has been attributed to the small numbers of researchers working on a pathogen.

== 19th-century discoveries ==
=== Vibrio cholerae (1849–1884) ===
Vibrio cholerae bacteria are transmitted through contaminated water. Once ingested, the bacteria colonize the intestinal tract of the host and produce a toxin which causes body fluids to flow across the lining of the intestine. Death can result in 2–3 hours from dehydration if no treatment is provided.

Before the discovery of an infectious cause, the symptoms of cholera were thought to be caused by an excess of bile in the patient; the disease cholera gets its name from the Greek word χολή, meaning bile. This theory was consistent with humorism, and led to such medical practices as bloodletting. The bacterium was first reported in 1849 by Gabriel Pouchet, who discovered it in stools from patients with cholera, but he did not appreciate the significance of this presence. The first scientist to understand the significance of Vibrio cholerae was the Italian anatomist Filippo Pacini, who published detailed drawings of the organism in "Microscopical observations and pathological deductions on cholera" in 1854. He published further papers in 1866, 1871, 1876, and 1880, which were ignored by the scientific community. He correctly described how the bacteria caused diarrhea, and developed treatments that were found to be effective. Whilst John Snow's epidemiological maps were well recognized and led to the removal of the Broad Street pump handle (e.g., the 1854 Broad Street cholera outbreak), in 1874, scientific representatives from 21 countries voted unanimously to resolve that cholera was caused by environmental toxins from miasmata, or clouds of unhealthy substances which float in the air. In 1884, Robert Koch re-discovered Vibrio cholerae as a causal element in cholera. Some scientists opposed the new theory, and even drank cholera cultures to disprove it:

Koch announced his discovery of the cholera vibrio in 1884. His conclusions were based upon the constant finding of the peculiar "comma bacillus" in the stools of cholera patients, and the failure to demonstrate this organism in the feces of other persons. It was not possible to reproduce typical cholera in laboratory animals. At the time the "germ theory" of disease had not yet obtained general acceptance, and Koch's announcement was received with considerable skepticism, particularly after it was found that similar "comma bacilli" could be found at times in the feces of persons not suffering from cholera, and often in all sorts of other environments - well and river waters, cheese, etc. We now know that these were saprotrophic species of Vibrio, which may be differentiated from the cholera vibrio by cultural and immunological methods. But the correctness of Koch's opinion was dramatically demonstrated by von Pettenkofer and Emmerich who, doubting the etiological relationship of Koch's organisms, deliberately drank cultures of it. Von Pettenkofer developed merely a transient diarrhea, but Emmerich suffered from a typical and severe attack of cholera.

— by A. T. Henrici, The Biology of Bacteria, DC Heath and Company, 1939. ASIN B00085GABK,

Von Pettenkofer considered his experience proof that Vibrio cholerae was harmless, as he did not develop cholera from consuming the culture. Between 1849, when Pouchet discovered Vibrio cholerae, and 1891, over a million people died in cholera epidemics in Europe and Russia. In 1995, researchers published a study in Science explaining why some persons are able to be infected with cholera without symptoms, possibly explaining why Pettenkofer did not get sick. The study showed that a series of genetic mutations in some people provide resistance to cholera toxin; but these mutations come at a price. If too many of them occur in a person, they will develop cystic fibrosis, an incurable and often fatal genetic disorder.

== 20th-century discoveries ==
=== Giardia lamblia (1681–1975) ===
Giardiasis is a disease caused by infection with the protozoan Giardia lamblia. Infection with Giardia can produce diarrhea, gas, and abdominal pain in some people. If untreated, infection can be chronic. In children, chronic Giardia infection can cause stunting (stunted growth) and lowered intelligence. Infection with Giardia is now universally recognized as a disease and treated by physicians with antiprotozoal drugs. Since 2002, Giardia cases must be reported to the United States Centers for Disease Control and Prevention (CDC), according to the CDC's Reportable Disease Spreadsheet. The U.S. National Institutes of Health Gastrointestinal Parasites Lab studies Giardia almost exclusively.

However, Giardia experienced an extraordinarily long term of emergence, from its discovery in 1681 until the 1970s when it was fully accepted that infection with Giardia was a treatable cause of chronic diarrhea:

Giardia lamblia was first discovered by Leeuwenhoeck (1681) who found the parasite in his own {diarrheal} stools. It was long considered to be a harmless commensal organism, but in recent years has been recognized as a cause of intestinal disease often acquired by travelers to foreign countries, persons drinking contaminated water in this country, children in day care nurseries and homosexual males. It is the most common pathogenic intestinal parasite in the United States, being found in 4% of stool specimens submitted to state public health laboratories for parasite examination. Attesting to its increasing importance in the United States, a symposium on Giardiasis, sponsored by the Environmental Protection Agency, was held in the fall of 1978.

— by J. W. Smith, Giardiasis, 1980

Some of the first evidence in modern times of Giardia's pathogenicity came during World War II when soldiers were treated for malaria with the antiprotozoal quinacrine, and their diarrhea disappeared, as did the Giardia from their stool samples. In 1954, Dr. R.C. Rendtorff performed experiments on prisoner volunteers, infecting them with Giardia. In the experiment, although some prisoners experienced changes in stool habits, he concluded that these could not be conclusively linked to Giardia infection, and also indicated that all prisoners experienced spontaneous clearance of Giardia. His experiments were described at the EPA Symposium on Waterborne Transmission of Giardiasis in 1978:

[...] we also included Giardia lamblia, which at that time was not generally believed to be an invasive pathogenic parasite of man. Giardia was thought in the 1950's to cause occasional problems of diarrhea in children but its appearance was so common and, in adults so lacking in clinical symptomatology, that most considered it a non-pathogen. As a result, we felt safe in exposing prisoners to Giardia.

— Dr. R. C. Rendtorff's findings, as summarized for the EPA Symposium on the Waterborne Transmission of Giardiasis, 1978

In 1954–1955, an outbreak of Giardia infection occurred in Oregon (United States), sickening 50,000 people. This was documented in a communication by Dr. Lyle Veazie, which wasn't published until 15 years later in The New England Journal of Medicine. In the communication, Veazie notes that he was unable to find a publisher for his account of the epidemic. The communication was re-published in the Proceedings of the EPA Symposium on Waterborne Transmission of Giardiasis in 1979, and that version included the following quote from the Director of the Oregon State Board of Health, suggesting that diarrhea from Giardia was still being attributed to other causes by health authorities in 1954:

While an unidentified virus seems the most likely etiologic agent, the unusual prevalence of Giardia lamblia cysts in stools of patients seems worthy of record.

— by Oregon State Board of Health commenting on the 1954–1955 outbreak of Giardiasis, as quoted in Veazie, 1979

=== Helicobacter pylori (1892–1982) ===
Infection with the bacteria Helicobacter pylori is the cause of most stomach ulcers. The discovery is generally credited to Australian gastroenterologists Dr. Barry Marshall and Dr. J. Robin Warren, who published their findings in 1983. The pair received the Nobel Prize in 2005 for their work. Before this, nobody really knew what caused stomach ulcers, though a popular belief was that the "stress" played a role. Some researchers suggested that ulcers were a psychosomatic illness.

In H Pylori Pioneers, Dr. Marshall noted that other physicians had produced evidence of H. pylori infection as early as 1892. Marshall writes that earlier reports were disregarded because they conflicted with existing belief. The first description of H. pylori came in 1892 from Giulio Bizzozero, who identified acid-tolerant bacteria living in a dog's stomach. Later, a theory would be developed that no bacteria could live in the stomach. Although the theory has no scientific basis, it would become a stumbling block for scientists, discouraging them for searching for infective causes of stomach ulcers. In 1940, two physicians, Dr. A. Stone Freeberg and Dr. Louis E. Barron published a paper describing a spiral bacteria found in about half of their gastroenterology patients who had stomach ulcers. Dr. John Lykoudis, a Greek physician, was one of the first physicians to treat stomach ulcers as an infectious disease. Between 1960 and 1970, he treated over 10,000 ulcer patients in Athens with antibiotics. Lykoudis tried to publish a paper on his findings, but they conflicted with traditional theory, and his work was never published. Lykoudis' experience was followed in 1975 by a further publication in Gut magazine that included spiral bacteria living on the borders of duodonal ulcers. The medical significance of Steer's findings was disregarded, but he “continued to publish papers on H. Pylori, mostly as a hobby."

H. pylori can infect the stomach of some people without causing stomach ulcers. In investigating asymptomatic carriers of H. pylori, researchers identified a genetic trait called Interleuik-1 beta-31 which causes increased production of stomach acid, resulting in ulcers if patients become infected with H. pylori. Patients without the trait do not develop stomach ulcers in response to H. pylori infection, but instead have increased risk from stomach cancer if they become infected. Investigation into other gastrointestinal infections has also shown that the symptoms are the result of interaction between the infection and specific genetic mutations in the host.

=== Pathogenic variants of Escherichia coli (1947–1983) ===
There are different types of E. coli, some of which are found in humans and are harmless. Enterotoxigenic Escherichia coli (ETEC) is a type found to cause illness in humans, possessing gene that allows it to manufacture a substance toxic to humans. Cattle are immune to its effects but when people eat food contaminated with cattle feces, the organism can cause disease. Reports of pathogenic E. coli appear in medical literature as early as 1947. Publications regarding variants of E. coli which cause disease appeared regularly in medical journals throughout the 1950s, '60s, and '70s, with fatalities being reported in humans and infants starting in the 1970s. Despite the earlier reports, pathogenic E. coli did not rise to public prominence until 1983, when a CDC researcher published a paper identifying ETEC as the cause of a series of outbreaks of unexplained hemorrhagic gastrointestinal illness. Despite the earlier publication of pathogenic variants of E. coli, researchers encountered significant difficulties in establishing ETEC as a pathogen.

=== Human immunodeficiency virus (1959–1984) ===
AIDS was first reported June 5, 1981, when the CDC recorded a cluster of Pneumocystis carinii pneumonia (now still classified as PCP but known to be caused by Pneumocystis jirovecii) in five homosexual men in Los Angeles. The discovery of the virus took several years of research, and was announced in 1984 by Dr. Gallo of the U.S. National Cancer Institute, Dr. Luc Montagnier at the Pasteur Institute in Paris, and Dr. Jay Levy at the University of California, San Francisco.

However, HIV existed long before the 1981 CDC report. Three of the earliest known instances of HIV infection are as follows:

1. A plasma sample taken in 1959 from an adult male living in what is now the Democratic Republic of the Congo.
2. HIV found in tissue samples from a 15-year-old African-American teenager who died in St. Louis in 1969.
3. HIV found in tissue samples from a Norwegian sailor who died around 1976.

Two species of HIV infect humans: HIV-1 and HIV-2. More virulent and more easily transmitted, HIV-1 is the source of the majority of HIV infections throughout the world, while HIV-2 is not as easily transmitted and is largely confined to West Africa. Both HIV-1 and HIV-2 are of primate origin. The origin of HIV-1 is the central common chimpanzee (Pan troglodytes troglodytes) found in southern Cameroon. It is established that HIV-2 originated from the sooty mangabey (Cercocebus atys), an Old World monkey of Guinea Bissau, Gabon, and Cameroon.

It is hypothesized that HIV probably transferred to humans as a result of direct contact with primates, for instance during hunting, butchery, or inter-species sexual contact.

=== Cyclospora (1995) ===
Cyclospora cayetanensis is a gastrointestinal pathogen that causes fever, diarrhea, vomiting, and severe weight loss. Outbreaks of cyclosporiasis occurred in Chicago in 1989 and other areas in the United States. But investigation by the CDC could not identify an infectious cause. The discovery of the cause was made by Mr. Ramachandran Rajah, the head of a medical clinic's laboratory in Kathmandu, Nepal. Mr. Rajah was trying to discover why local residents and visitors were becoming ill every summer. He identified an unusual looking organism in stool samples from patients who were sick. But when the clinic sent slides of the organism to the CDC, it was identified as blue-green algae, which is harmless. Many pathologists had seen the same thing before, but dismissed it as irrelevant to the patient's disease. Later, the organism would be identified as a special kind of parasite, and treatment would be developed to help patients with the infection. In the United States, Cyclospora infection must be reported to the CDC according to the CDC's Reportable Disease Chart

== Present-day discoveries ==
The process of identifying new infectious agents continues. One study has suggested there are a large number of pathogens already causing illness in the population, but they have not yet been properly identified.

=== Gastrointestinal pathogens ===
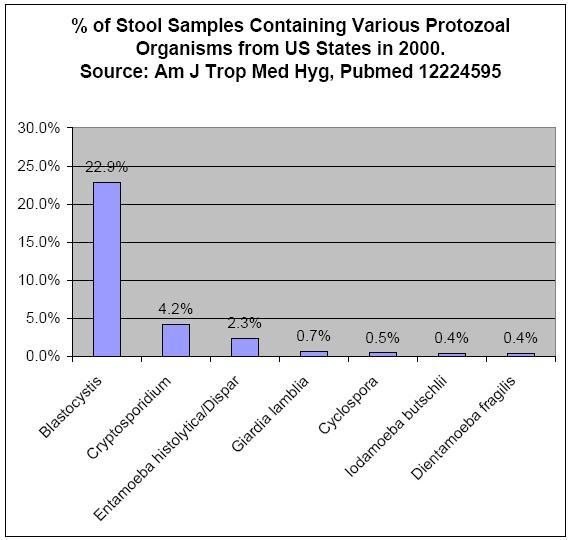
Percentage of stool samples from US states found to contain various protozoa in 2000

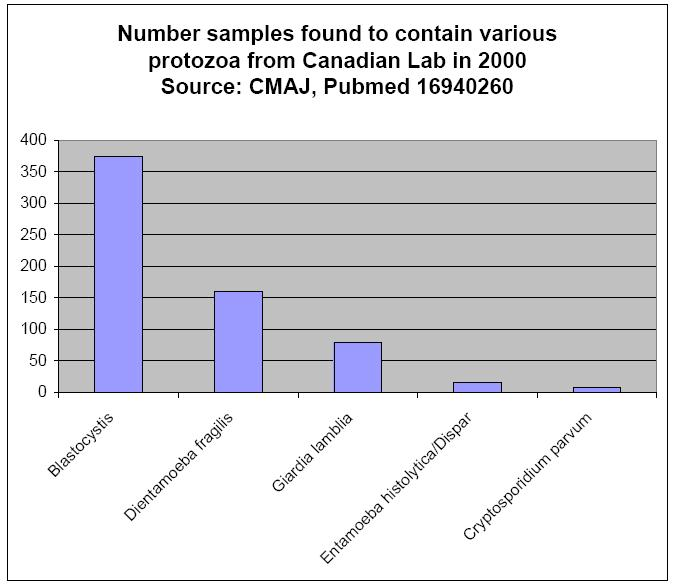
Number of stool samples from Canadian Lab found to contain various protozoa in 2005

Many recently emerged pathogens infect the gastrointestinal tract. For example, there are three gastrointestinal protozoal infections which must be reported to the CDC: Giardia, Cyclospora, and Cryptosporidium. None of these was known to be a significant pathogen in the 1970s.

Figure 1 shows the prevalence of gastrointestinal protozoa in studies from the United States and Canada. The most prevalent protozoa in these studies are considered emerging infectious diseases by some researchers, because a consensus does not yet exist in the medical and public health spheres concerning their importance in the role of human disease. Researchers have suggested that their treatment may be complicated by differing opinions regarding pathogenicity, lack of reliable testing procedures, and lack of reliable treatments. As with newly discovered pathogens before them, researchers are reporting that these organisms may be responsible for illnesses for which no clear cause has been found, such as irritable bowel syndrome.

==== Dientamoeba fragilis ====
Dientamoeba fragilis is a single-celled parasite which infects the large intestine causing diarrhea, gas, and abdominal pain. An Australian study identified patients with symptoms of IBS who were actually infected with Dientamoeba fragilis. Their symptoms resolved following treatment. A study in Denmark identified a high incidence Dientamoeba fragilis infection in a group of patients suspected of having gastrointestinal illness of an infectious nature. The study also suggested special methods may be required to identify infection.

==== Blastocystis ====
Blastocystis is a single-celled protozoan which infects the large intestine. Physicians report that patients with infection show symptoms of abdominal pain, constipation, and diarrhea. One study found that 43% of IBS patients were infected with Blastocystis versus 7% of controls. An additional study found that many IBS patients from whom Blastocystis could not be identified showed a strong antibody reaction to the organism, which is a type of test used to diagnose certain difficult-to-detect infections. Other researchers have also reported that special testing techniques may be necessary to identify the infection in some people. While some scientists believe the finding that IBS patients carry a protozoal infection to be significant, other researchers have reported their belief that the presence of the infection is not medically significant. Researchers report that the infection can be resistant to common protozoal treatments in laboratory culture study, and in experience with patients,; therefore, identifying Blastocystis infection may not be of immediate help to a patient. A 2006 study of gastrointestinal infections in the United States suggested that Blastocystis infection has become the leading cause of protozoal diarrhea in that country. Blastocystis was the most frequently identified protozoal infection found in patients in a 2006 Canadian study.

== See also ==
- Spanish flu
- Black Death
- Bubonic plague
- Pandemic
- Smallpox
