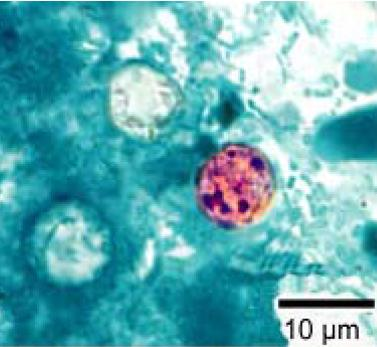
- Cyclospora cayetanensis oocysts

Scientific classification
- Domain: Eukaryota
- Clade: Sar
- Clade: Alveolata
- Phylum: Apicomplexa
- Class: Conoidasida
- Order: Eucoccidiorida
- Family: Eimeriidae
- Genus: Cyclospora; Schneider, 1881

= Cyclospora =

Genus of single-celled organisms

Cyclospora is a genus of apicomplexan parasites. It includes the species Cyclospora cayetanensis, the causative agent of the disease cyclosporiasis. Members of Cyclospora are characterized as having oocysts with two sporocysts, each containing two sporozoites.

== Species ==
Several Cyclospora species have been described in various mammals including:

- Cyclospora angimurinensis (from the Hispid pocket mouse)
- Cyclospora ashtabulensis (from the Hairy-tailed mole)
- Cyclospora caryolytica (from various insect-eating mammals)
- Cyclospora cayetanensis (from humans)
- Cyclospora cercopitheci (from African green monkeys)
- Cyclospora colobi (from the Colobus monkey)
- Cyclospora megacephali (from the Eastern mole)
- Cyclospora papionis (from the Olive baboon)
- Cyclospora parascalopi (from the Hairy-tailed mole)
- Cyclospora talpae (from the European mole)

A smaller number of species have been described from reptiles, arthropods, and snakes:

- Cyclospora glomericola (from a millipede of the genus Glomeris)
- Cyclopsora niniae (from the snake Ninia sebae)
- Cyclospora scinci (from Scincus officinalis)
- Cyclospora viperae (from Vipera aspis)
- Cyclopsora zamensis (from various snakes)

== Taxonomy and evolution ==
Cyclospora are eukaryotes in the phylum Apicomplexa. Within the Apicomplexa, Cyclospora belong to the sub-class Coccidia and family Eimeriidae.

Taxonomy of the coccidia is based upon morphological descriptions of observed parasites, and therefore does not always reflect evolutionary relationships. Genetic studies of the well-conserved SSU rRNA from various specimens has suggested that parasites in Cyclospora may be more closely related to some species of Eimeria that infect birds than the rest of the genus Eimeria is. Relationships among various coccidia estimated for SSU rRNA sequences are shown in the cladogram below:

- Family Sarcocystidae
- Family Eimeriidae
  - Caryospora
  - - Lankesterella
    - - Eimeria species of rodents and bats
      - - Eimeria species of sheep and bovids
        - - Cyclospora
          - Eimeria species of birds

== History ==
The genus Cyclospora was created in 1881 to describe a parasite found in a millipede of the genus Glomeris.
