= 2018 American salmonella outbreak =

Foodbourne disease outbreak from poultry in Iowa, U.S.

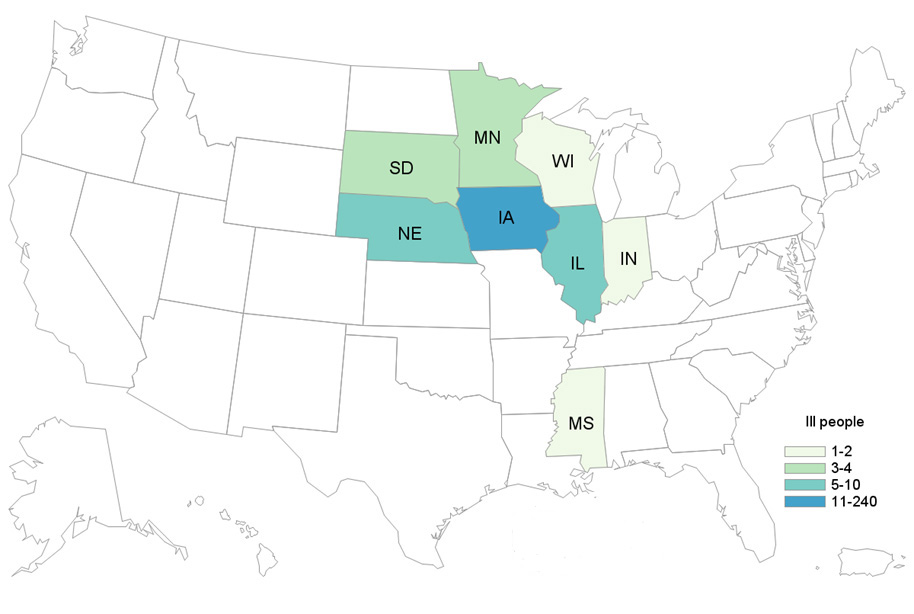
2018 USA Salmonella Typhimurium Outbreak - Case Map by the State of Residence

The 2018 American salmonella outbreak was an American foodborne disaster that started in Iowa, spreading to 7 other states, sickening as many as 265 people, killing one, with 94 hospitalized. Ready-to-eat chicken salad was produced by Iowa-based Triple T Specialty Meats Inc. between January 2 and February 7 for distribution in Fareway grocery stores. Salad was sold in containers of various weights at Fareway stores deli from January 4 to February 9. Total of approximately 20,630 pounds of chicken were deemed contaminated with Salmonella Typhimurium at the time of recall on February 21.

== Overview ==
Illnesses started from January 8 to March 20. 94 hospitalizations, including one death, were reported. On February 9 Iowa Department of Public Health (IDPH) notified the US Department of Agriculture’s Food Safety and Inspection Service (FSIS) of its investigation of Salmonella-related illnesses.

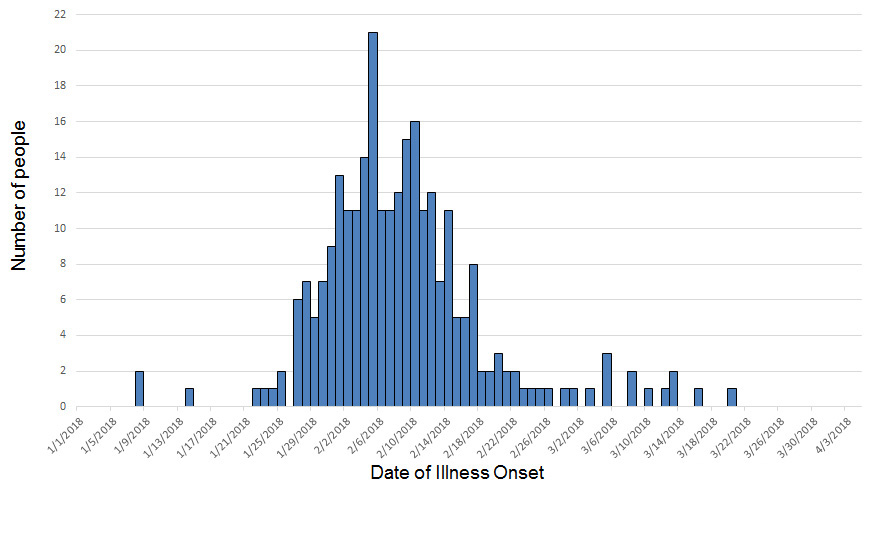
Epi Curve 2018 US Salmonella Outbreak

Samples of chicken salad were collected in February for testing at Iowa State Hygienic Laboratory (SHL). Test results were presumptive positive Salmonella Typhimurium, leading to a joint public IDPH and the Iowa Department of Inspections and Appeals (IDIA) alert.

== Epidemiology ==
265 people in 8 states were identified to carry similar Salmonella Typhimurium strains, predominantly in Iowa (240 cases). Additional cases appeared in Illinois (10), Nebraska (5), Minnesota (4), South Dakota (3) and in Indiana, Mississippi and Wisconsin, with one case respectively.

Out of 222 patients interviewed, 87% reported chicken salad consumption. Overall, 94 people had to be hospitalised with one reported death in Iowa. Patients age ranged from less than 1 to 89 years, with a median of 57.67, the majority female (67%).

== Timeline ==
Month	Date	Event
January 2018	January 2	Production of contaminated chicken salad by Triple T Specialty Meats, Inc. (until February 7)
	January 4	Products retailed at Fareway Grocery Stores
	January 8	First patients identified with Salmonella
February 2018	February 9	Voluntary removal of chicken salad from Fareway stores, after an alert by the Iowa Department of Inspections and Appeals (DIA)
	February 13	Department of Public Health & DIA issue consumer advisory
	February 14	FSIS issues a Public Health Alert
	February 21	Voluntary product recall by Triple T Specialty Meats, Inc. (Class I Recall)
March 2018	March 20	Last patient identified
April 2018	April 6	Outbreak declared over

== Transmission ==
According to the Centers for Disease Control investigative report, the likely source of this outbreak was chicken salad produced by Triple T Specialty Meats, Inc. from January 2, 2018, to February 7, 2018. This specific product was sold in various weights at Fareway grocery stores in Illinois, Iowa, Minnesota, Nebraska and South Dakota and were subsequently recalled by Triple T Specialty Meats Inc. on February 21, 2018, due to the possible Salmonella contamination as at the time, the source had not been confirmed.

During the investigation, public health officials in Iowa interviewed 222 people and 197 of those reported eating a chicken salad from Fareway grocery stores. Iowa Investigators then collected samples for laboratory testing from Fareway grocery stores and the outbreak strain of Salmonella Typhimurium was identified in both samples.

== Signs and symptoms ==
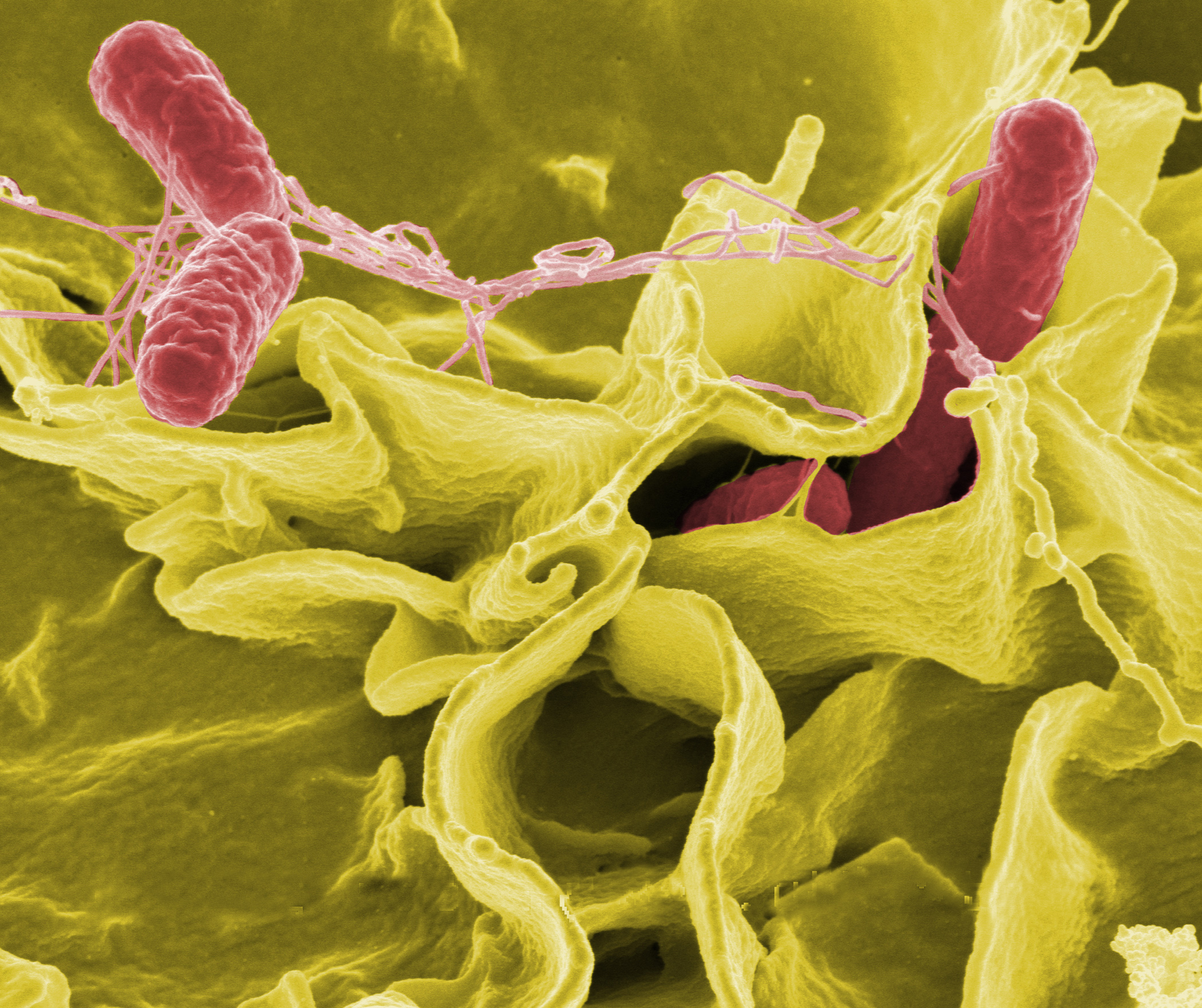
Color-enhanced scanning electron micrograph showing Salmonella Typhimurium (red) invading cultured human cells

Salmonella is a bacterium that produces the symptoms of diarrhoea, fever and abdominal cramps in infected individuals 12-72 hours after exposure. Most people recover without treatment and the illness usually lasts for 4-7 days.

Some people may need hospitalization due to severe symptoms and in rare cases, Salmonella can cause death unless the person is treated with antibiotics promptly. Those most likely to develop severe salmonella are children under the age of 5, adults over the age of 65 and people with compromised immune systems.

== Treatment ==
Treatment of salmonella infections depends on age and pre-disposition of the infected person and the severity of the symptoms. One of the side-effects from salmonella infection is dehydration, making the replacement of fluids and electrolytes the main treatment for less severe infections. In severe cases, patients are treated with antibiotics, rehydrated with intravenous (IV) fluids and hospitalized. In cases where the infection spreads from the intestines to the bloodstream, quick treatment with antibiotics is required to prevent the risk of death.

Possible complications include resistances to certain antibiotics in the salmonella streaks, that might require treatment with different antibiotics than commonly prescribed antibiotics. In this case, whole-genome sequencing (WGS) analysis identified no antibiotic resistance in 112 of 127 isolates.

== Prevention and structural consequences ==
Following the incident, the FSIS reviewed and revised foodborne illness related procedures to accelerate response times, clarify responsibilities and improve communication. Measures include enhanced communication processes with partners, advice to strengthen collaboration with industry and updated guidelines on sampling. The PulseNet national laboratory network connects foodborne illness cases to detect outbreaks using DNA fingerprinting of bacteria that make people sick. Since establishment in 1996 PulseNet has been instrumental in detecting thousands of local and multistate outbreaks, identifying Salmonella 2018 among others.

== CDC investigation ==
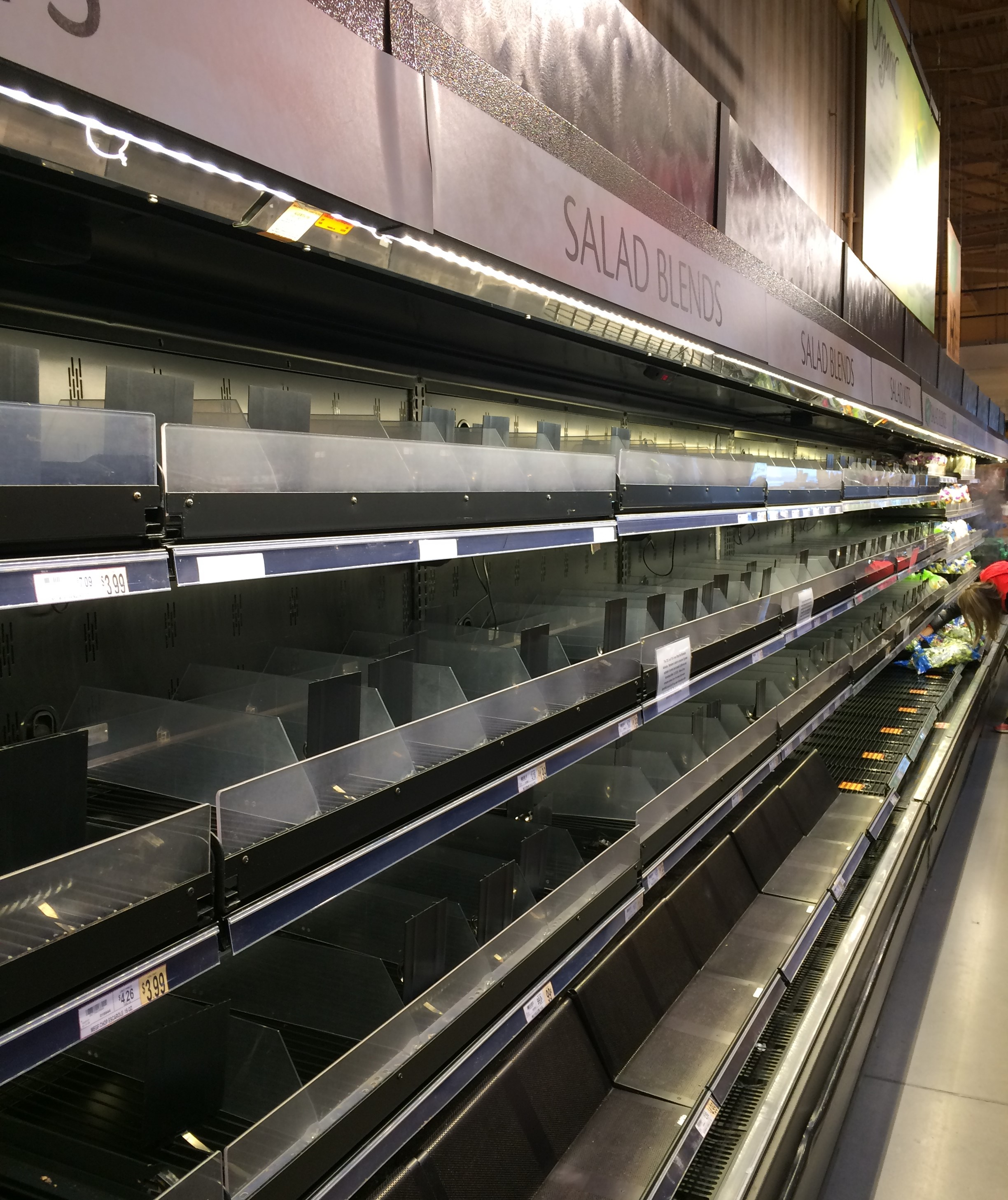
Emptied grocery shelves during the 2018 American salmonella outbreak. Such clearances were done to prevent the sale of potentially contaminated agricultural products

On February 22, 2018, the Centers for Disease Control and Prevention (CDC) released their first statement about a collaborative investigation into a multistate outbreak of Salmonella Typhimurium with public health officials and regulatory officials in several states. As of February 21, 2018, 65 people were infected with the outbreak strain in 5 states. They used epidemiological and laboratory evidence to trace the source of the outbreak and this resulted in a recall.

On March 7, 2018, the Centers for Disease Control announced a case count update of 105 more infected people in 6 states and they anticipated a delay in case number updates due to the 2-4 week window of initial infection to case reporting, their last announcement showed that as of April 6, 2018, the outbreak was over.

== Lawsuits ==
Litigation cases in Iowa were set between the victims and Fareway grocery stores and Triple T Specialty Meats, Inc. with regards to the Salmonella outbreak and victims filed civil suits in federal court to seek reimbursement for medical costs as well as other costs. The 50 lawsuits against Fareway and Triple T Specialty Meats were subsequently settled.

== See also ==
- Salmonella Typhimurium
- Salmonella
