= Fareway =

American grocery store chain

Fareway Stores, Inc.
- Trade name: Fareway Meat & Grocery
- Formerly: Fareway Economical Food Stores
- Company type: Private
- Industry: Retail
- Founded: 1938 (88 years ago) in Boone, Iowa, U.S.
- Founder: Paul S. Beckwith
- Headquarters: Johnston, Iowa, U.S.
- Number of locations: 141 (2025)
- Key people: P. Sue Beckwith, MD, Chairman of the Board; Reynolds W. Cramer, CEO; Garrett S. Piklapp, President
- Products: Bakery, dairy, delicatessen, frozen foods, grocery, lottery, pharmacy, produce, meats, snack food, liquor, flowers, and Western Union
- Revenue: ▲US$1.5 billion (2021)
- Owner: Beckwith family
- Number of employees: 12,000+
- Subsidiaries: FarewayMeatMarket.com; Midwest Quality Wholesale; McGonigle's KC BBQ + Catering; Brewer Foods
- Website: fareway.com

Fareway Stores, Inc. is a Midwest grocery store chain based in Boone, Iowa. It operates 137 grocery store locations in Iowa, Illinois, Minnesota, Nebraska, South Dakota, Kansas, and Missouri.

== History ==
On May 12, 1938, Paul S. Beckwith opened the first Fareway store in Boone, Iowa located at 624 Story Street. Beckwith chose the name "Fareway" as he emphasized treating customers and employees fairly. By 1950, there were 6 locations across Iowa.

On February 23, 1964, a massive fire caused $1 million in damages to the original Fareway store and warehouse in Boone.

In 2013, Fareway expanded and opened its first store outside of Iowa, opening a store in Tea, South Dakota.

In December 2018, Fareway announced a new plan to help eligible full-time employees pay off their student loan debt. This benefit gives $100 a month with an upper limit of $5,000 total. This adds Fareway Stores, Inc. to the roughly four percent of companies across the nation that offer employee benefits concerning student loan debt.

In 2024, Fareway moved their headquarters from Boone, Iowa to Johnston, Iowa. The current CEO, Reynolds Cramer, officially announced the company's departure from Boone in 2023.
