= Mojo Motors =

Mojo Motors, Inc.
- Type: Private
- Industry: Automotive
- Founded: 2011
- Headquarters: New York City, NY, United States
- Key people: Paul Nadjarian (Founder & CEO); Tae Oh (CTO); Nicholas Frank (VP of Sales); Jason Morman (Sales Team Lead)
- Website: www.mojomotors.com

Mojo Motors, Inc. was an American automotive classified website for preowned automobiles.

== Background ==
Founder Paul Nadjarian was a Ford Motor Company and eBay Motors executive before starting Mojo Motors, Inc. in 2011. The startup aggregates used cars from dealerships in a geographic area that offer discount pricing and then alerts shoppers, when the price of the vehicle they are following drops in price.

== Funding ==
In 2012, the company secured nearly $5 million in funding from venture firms Atlas Venture, RPM Ventures and NextView Ventures to expand nationwide.
