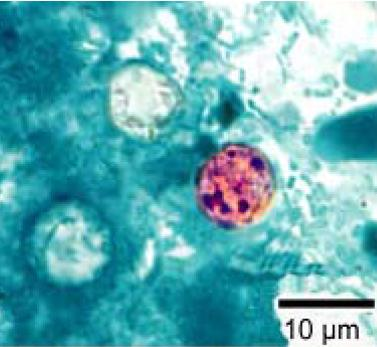
- Cyclospora cayetanensis oocysts

Scientific classification
- Domain: Eukaryota
- Supergroup: Alveolata
- Phylum: Apicomplexa
- Class: Conoidasida
- Order: Eucoccidiorida
- Family: Eimeriidae
- Genus: Cyclospora
- Species: C. cayetanensis

Binomial name
- Cyclospora cayetanensis Ortega, Gilman & Sterling, 1994

= Cyclospora cayetanensis =

Species of single-celled organism

Cyclospora cayetanensis is a protozoan coccidia parasite that causes a diarrheal disease called cyclosporiasis in humans and possibly other primates. Originally reported as a novel pathogen of probable coccidian nature in the 1980s and described in the early 1990s, it was virtually unknown in developed countries until awareness increased due to several outbreaks linked with fecally contaminated imported produce. C. cayetanensis has since emerged as an endemic cause of diarrheal disease in tropical countries and a cause of travelers' diarrhea and food-borne infections in developed nations.

This species was placed in the genus Cyclospora because of the spherical shape of its sporocysts. The specific name refers to the Cayetano Heredia University in Lima, Peru, where early epidemiological and taxonomic work was done.

== Characterization ==
Lifecycle diagram of Cyclospora cayetanensis parasitizing humans. Notice how it requires produce as a vector, and its contamination with human excrement already containing Cyclospora cayetanensis during the farming process.

Cyclospora cayetanensis is an apicomplexan, cyst-forming coccidian protozoan that causes a self-limiting diarrhea called cyclosporiasis. In terms of morphology, it has spherical oocysts that are 7.5–10 μm in diameter that also have a 50-nm-thick wall with an outer thread-like coat that has been called a wrinkle by some researchers. The oocyst formula is O.2.2 because one oocyst contains two sporocysts and each sporocyst contains two sporozoites.

The only confirmed hosts for C. cayetanensis are humans. The protist pathogen lives out its lifecycle intracellularly within the host's epithelial cells and gastrointestinal tract. When an oocyst of Cyclospora cayetanensis enters the small intestine, it invades the mucosa, where it incubates for about one week. The parasite particularly affects the jejunum of the small intestine. Of nine patients in Nepal who were diagnosed with cyclosporiasis, all had inflammation of the lamina propria along with an increase of plasma in the lamina propria. Oocysts were also observed in duodenal aspirates.

Infection is transmitted through the fecal-oral route, and begins when a person ingests oocysts in feces-contaminated food or water. Various chemicals in the host's gastrointestinal tract cause the oocysts to excyst and release sporozoites; generally, two are observed per oocyst. After these sporozoites invade the epithelial cells, they undergo merogony, a form of asexual reproduction that results in many daughter merozoites. These daughter cells may either infect new host cells and initiate yet another round of merogony or take on a sexual track via gametogony: Daughter merozoites become male macrogamonts—which form many microgametes—and female macrogamonts. After fertilization occurs via male microgamete fusion with the female macrogamont, the zygote matures into an oocyst and ruptures the host cell, after which it is passed with the stool. The oocysts that are passed are not, however, immediately infectious. Sporulation can take from one to several weeks, meaning person-to-person transmission is unlikely. This differentiates C. cayetanensis from Cryptosporidium parvum—a closely related organism that causes a similar disease—since C. parvum oocysts are immediately infectious upon release from the host.

== History ==
As originally recognized by Markus & Frean (1993), the first published report of Cyclospora cayetanensis in humans appears to be by Ashford (1979), who found unidentified Isospora-like coccidia in the feces of three individuals in Papua New Guinea. The photomicrographs in his paper reveal an organism morphologically identical to that seen nowadays. Markus had perceived the probable coccidial nature of Cyclospora in the 1980s but did not formally publish his ideas on the matter. Later, Narango et al. (1989) reported what may be the same organism from several Peruvians with chronic diarrhea and termed the organism Cryptosporidium muris–like. Other investigators thought the unsporulated oocysts appeared more similar to cyanobacteria, and the name "cyanobacterium-like body" or CLB became prevalent in the literature (occasionally, authors also used the term "coccidian-like body", or CLB). Eventually, Ortega et al. (1992) published an abstract reporting that they had sporulated and excysted the oocysts, resulting in placement of the parasite in the genus Cyclospora. They also created the name Cyclospora cayetanensis at this time. However, since no morphologic information was presented in the abstract, C. cayetanensis technically became a nomen nudum (a named species without a description). Although Ortega et al. (1993) later published additional details about this coccidian, a complete morphologic description was not published to validate the name until 1994. Thus, the correct name for this parasite is Cyclospora cayetanensis Ortega, Gilman, & Sterling, 1994, and the etymology of the nomen triviale is derived from Cayetano Heredia University in Lima, Peru. During these two years when C. cayetanensis was a nomen nudum, anyone wishing to publish a complete morphological description and change the name would have been free to do so.
