= Cyclosporiasis =

Foodborne protozoan infection

- Other names: cyclosporosis
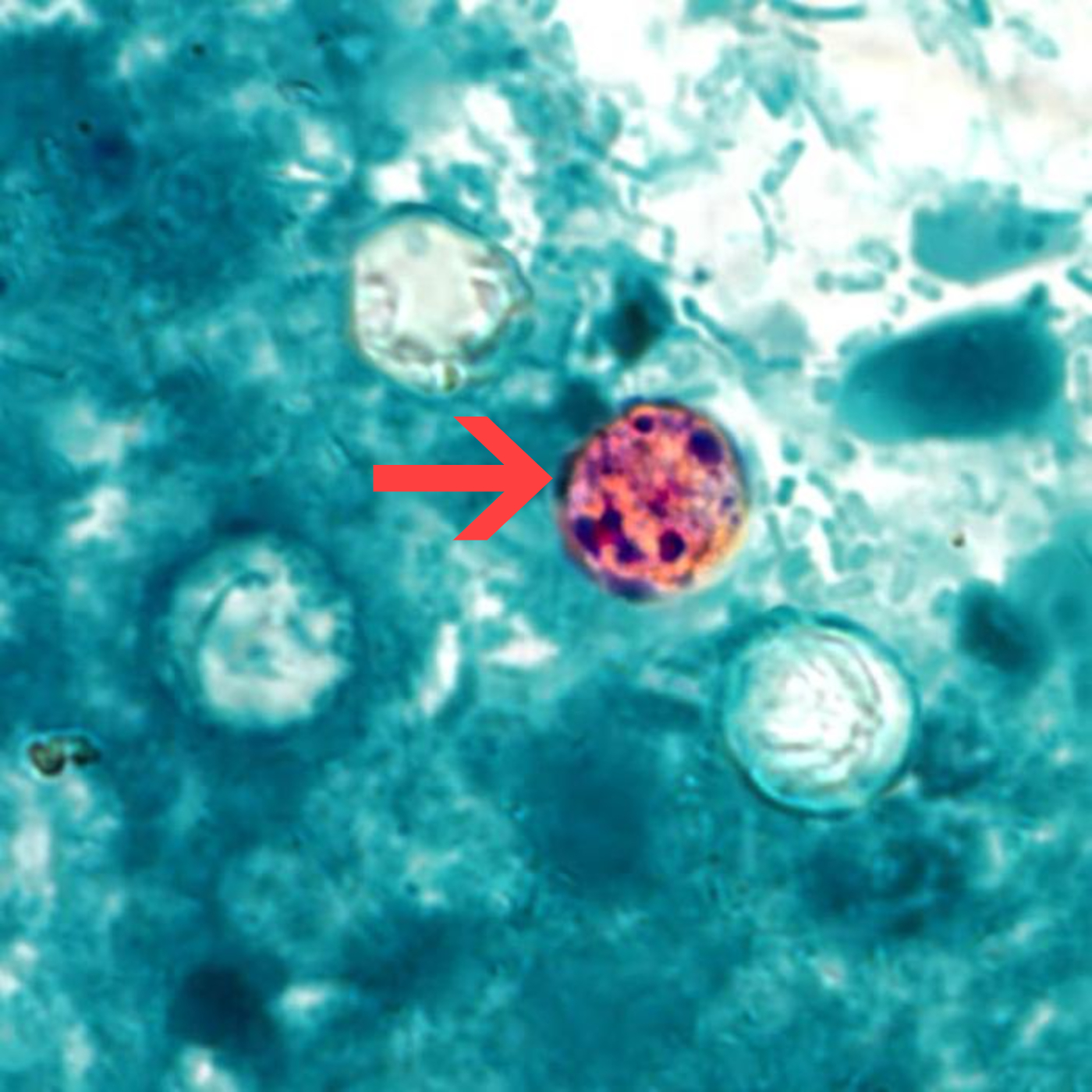
- Cyclospora cayetanensis
- Specialty: Infectious disease
- Symptoms: Watery diarrhea; loss of appetite; weight loss; abdominal pain; nausea; fatigue
- Complications: Dehydration; malnutrition
- Usual onset: 2–14+ days; most often ~7–10 days
- Duration: up to 6 weeks
- Causes: Cyclospora cayetanensis transmitted by fecal–oral route
- Risk factors: Consuming contaminated food (usually fresh produce) or water
- Diagnostic method: Examination of stool; PCR
- Prevention: Cooking, washing food
- Medication: Trimethoprim/sulfamethoxazole

Cyclosporiasis is a type of food poisoning. The primary symptom is watery diarrhea. Most cases have mild or no symptoms, but severe disease or death (typically due to dehydration) may occur, especially in infants and immunocompromised people.

It occurs from feces-contaminated food and water that contains eggs of Cyclospora cayetanensis, a protozoan. Because the eggs must sporulate in the environment for 1–2 weeks before they become infectious, direct spread between people is unlikely.

Cyclosporiasis occur worldwide, primarily in tropical and subtropical regions. Since the 2010s they have also occurred in the summer in the United States. Outbreaks in the United States have been linked to contaminated fruits and vegetables, and infection elsewhere is sometimes associated more broadly with poor sanitation standards.

== Signs and symptoms ==
Cyclospora cayetanensis causes gastroenteritis, with the extent of the illness varying based on age, condition of the host, and size of the infectious dose. Symptoms of cyclosporiasis include watery diarrhea, loss of appetite, weight loss, abdominal bloating and cramping, increased flatulence, nausea, fatigue, and low-grade fever. This can be augmented occasionally by vomiting, substantial weight loss, excessive diarrhea, and muscle aches.

The incubation period in the host is typically around a week after consuming infectious oocysts, and illness can last up to six weeks before self-limiting. Unless treated, illness may relapse. Disease tends to be more severe in vulnerable people, including infants, the elderly, people who do get sick but do not reside in endemic countries, and people with a weakened immune system, such as people with HIV/AIDS. Dehydration and malnutrition may complicate cases of cyclosporiasis when severe diarrhea occurs.

The occurrence of moderate to severe dehydration is uncommon, but when present, symptoms may include symptoms such as compensatory tachycardia, low blood pressure, and decreased skin turgor. However, clinical symptoms of dehydration are inconsistent, and may be very subtle even when dehydration is severe.

Immunocompromised patients are also known to sometimes exhibit nonspecific symptoms of influenza-like illness.

== Cause ==
Lifecycle diagram of Cyclospora cayetanensis parasitizing humans. Notice how it requires produce as a vector, and its contamination with human excrement already containing Cyclospora cayetanensis during the farming process.

Persons living or traveling in developing tropical or subtropical areas may be at an increased risk of acquiring C. cayetanensis, as it is endemic in these areas. Infections in endemic regions tend to show seasonality that is poorly understood, whereas North American outbreaks occur most frequently in late spring and summer, with warm temperatures being necessary for large numbers of oocysts to sporulate. Consuming unclean food or water while visiting developing countries is a well-documented way of developing travelers' diarrhea, though produce imported from developing countries may also cause it without international travel. Oocysts are often present in the environment as a result of using contaminated water or human feces as fertilizer.

Since oocysts are shed in the feces of infected persons and then must mature in the environment for 2–14 days before they can become infectious, a person getting an infection directly from another person, such as an infected food handler, is unlikely.

At the beginning of the AIDS epidemic in the early 1980s, cyclosporiasis was identified in stool samples of people with AIDS alongside Cryptosporidium, which is an important opportunistic infections in this group.

== Diagnosis ==
Diagnosis can be difficult due to the lack of recognizable oocysts in the feces. PCR-based DNA tests and acid-fast staining can help with identification. A history of recent consumption of foods more likely to be contaminated with Cyclospora oocysts, such as fresh leafy greens, basil, cilantro, or fresh berries, within two weeks of a compatible diarrheal illness during the summer should prompt suspicion for cyclosporiasis.

Except for PCR amplification, once a sample with suspected oocysts has been recovered, standard tests are followed to identify C. cayetanensis; phase contrast microscopy for the spherical oocysts, modified acid-fast staining for variable staining (from pale to red), and autofluorescence with ultraviolet lights are used. Obtaining these oocysts is usually the challenge, though recent studies show easier methods of obtaining them. In a recent study on different techniques used in fecal examinations to identify oocysts, centrifuging a sample of feces in a sucrose solution and then transferring a small amount to a slide was found to be remarkably effective—both in oocysts found and relative ease of labor—in detecting C. cayetanensis oocysts. Indeed, the paper concluded the positive samples obtained were around 84%.

At least one nucleic acid amplification test is available commercially in both the United States and Europe, and several additional testing panels are approved for use in Europe but not the United States.

=== Challenges ===
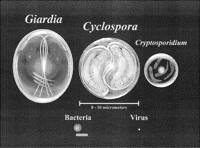
Comparing eggs with Cyclospora: Giardia-Cyclospora-Cryptosporidium-bacterium-virus

Due to its small size, intracellular habitat, and inability to properly take up many histological stains, diagnosis of C. cayetanensis can be very difficult. Four methods have thus far been established for positive diagnosis of the protozoan - microscopic detection in stool samples of oocysts, recovering oocysts in intestinal fluid/small bowel biopsy specimens, demonstration of oocyst sporulation, and amplification by PCR of C. cayetanensis DNA. Since detection is so hard, one negative result should not discount the possibility of C. cayetanensis; tests involving fresh stool samples over the next few days should also be considered. C. cayetanensis has been confused with other protozoan infections in the past, most commonly being misidentified as Cryptosporidium parvum. Several differences can be noted, including size—C. parvum is smaller; differing results from modified acid-fast staining—C. parvum has consistent red staining, whereas C. cayetanensis shows variable staining; and autofluorescence under UV light—C. cayetanensis exhibits this, whereas C. parvum does not.

== Prevention ==
No vaccine against this pathogen is available. Infection occurs via fecally contaminated food and water, and cooking food and boiling water is the only way to kill Cyclospora. Washing hands with soap and water before preparing food and washing fruits and vegetables under running water can reduce risk, but the pathogen cannot be reliably removed. It is not likely to be killed by routine sanitization.

Other advice warns travelers not to visit regions where the protozoan is endemic (tropical and subtropical regions with poor sanitation, such as Peru, Brazil, and Haiti), especially when conditions are most conducive to Cyclospora's spread. Treatment of water or food with chlorine or iodine is unlikely to kill Cyclospora oocysts. Better health practices in the originating agricultural setting such as ensuring produce-watering systems are not pulling water that has access to human feces can reduce spread. Additionally, filtering systems such as 1-micron absolute carbon will reduce the presence of Cyclospora, drastically decreasing the incidence of the spread of this parasite. The odds of becoming infected with Cyclospora, and many other foodborne pathogens, can be greatly diminished by thoroughly washing fruits and vegetables in clean water before consumption. However, simply washing food does not remove 100% of the oocysts present.

== Treatment ==
Most people who have healthy immune systems recover without treatment. If untreated, the illness may last for a few days to a month or longer. Signs and symptoms may seem to go away and then return one or more times (relapse). Antidiarrheal medicine may help reduce diarrhea, but consulting a health-care provider before taking it is recommended. People who are in poor health or who have weakened immune systems may be at higher risk for severe or prolonged illness.

=== First-line ===
Trimethoprim/sulfamethoxazole (TMP-SMX), also known as co-trimoxazole, is the treatment of choice. The recommended dose for immunocompetent adults is two doses of 160 mg TMP + 800 mg SMX per day for 7–10 days; immunocompromised adults typically receive the same dose, but for longer. The cure rate with TMP-SMX is around 96%.

Effects of TMP-SMX include a decrease in the duration of oocyst excretion, cessation of diarrhea, and stool samples negative for oocysts within two to three days. TMP-SMX is classified as Category C during pregnancy, meaning potential adverse effects (such as teratogenic or embryocidal or other) could result, and it should only be given if the potential benefit justifies the risk. It should be avoided near-term, as high potentials exist for hyperbilirubinemia and kernicterus in newborns. Additionally, TMP-SMX can be excreted in breast milk, which is compatible in healthy, full-term newborns, but should be avoided in premature, ill, stressed, or jaundiced infants.

=== Alternatives ===
For people unable to take trimethoprim/sulfamethoxazole (e.g., due to a sulfonamide allergy), nitazoxanide, or ciprofloxacin are recommended as alternative but much less effective agents. Some sources consider ciprofloxacin to be broadly ineffective.

Many common antiparasitic drugs are ineffective against Cyclospora, including: albendazole, azithromycin, tetracycline, doxycycline, metronidazole, trimethoprim (without sulfamethoxazole), tinidazole, quinacrine, nalidixic acid, and diloxanide furoate.

== Prognosis ==
Most cases of cyclosporiasis have only mild symptoms or are entirely asymptomatic. However, like other watery diarrheal illnesses (e.g. cholera), substantial health risks or death may result from severe dehydration. The risk of death due to dehydration or malnutrition is greatest in infants, elderly people, young children, and people with major comorbidities; older children and average adults have symptoms less often and of lower severity. Even in the higher-risk group, though, mortality is low overall. The 2020 outbreak in the United States, with 1,241 confirmed cases, had no reported deaths.

Rare cases have been reported of cyclosporiasis causing more severe disease manifestations that are not linked to dehydration, especially in immunocompromised patients. The parasite is capable of infecting the biliary tract and causing cholecystitis, and isolated case reports have identified other uncommon complications in some individuals.

== Epidemiology ==
=== Tropical and subtropical regions ===
Cyclosporiasis is a common disease in the tropics, contributing to a total worldwide prevalence in humans around 3.5%.

The first formally recorded cases of cyclosporiasis in humans were as recently as 1977, 1978, and 1979. They were reported by Ashford, a British parasitologist who discovered three cases while working in Papua New Guinea. Ashford found that the parasite had very late sporulation, from 8–11 days, making the illness difficult to diagnose. When examining feces, the unsporulated oocysts can easily be mistaken for fungal spores, thus are overlooked.

Cyclosporiasis infections have been reported in Nepal. In one study, Ghimire et al. collected samples of vegetables, sewage, and water from ponds, rivers, wells, and municipal taps in the Kathmandu Valley from 2002 to 2004. They found Cyclospora in radish, cauliflower, cabbage, and mustard leaves, as well as sewage and river water. This first epidemiological study determined the seasonal character of cyclosporiasis outbreaks in Nepal during the rainy season, from May to September.

=== United States ===
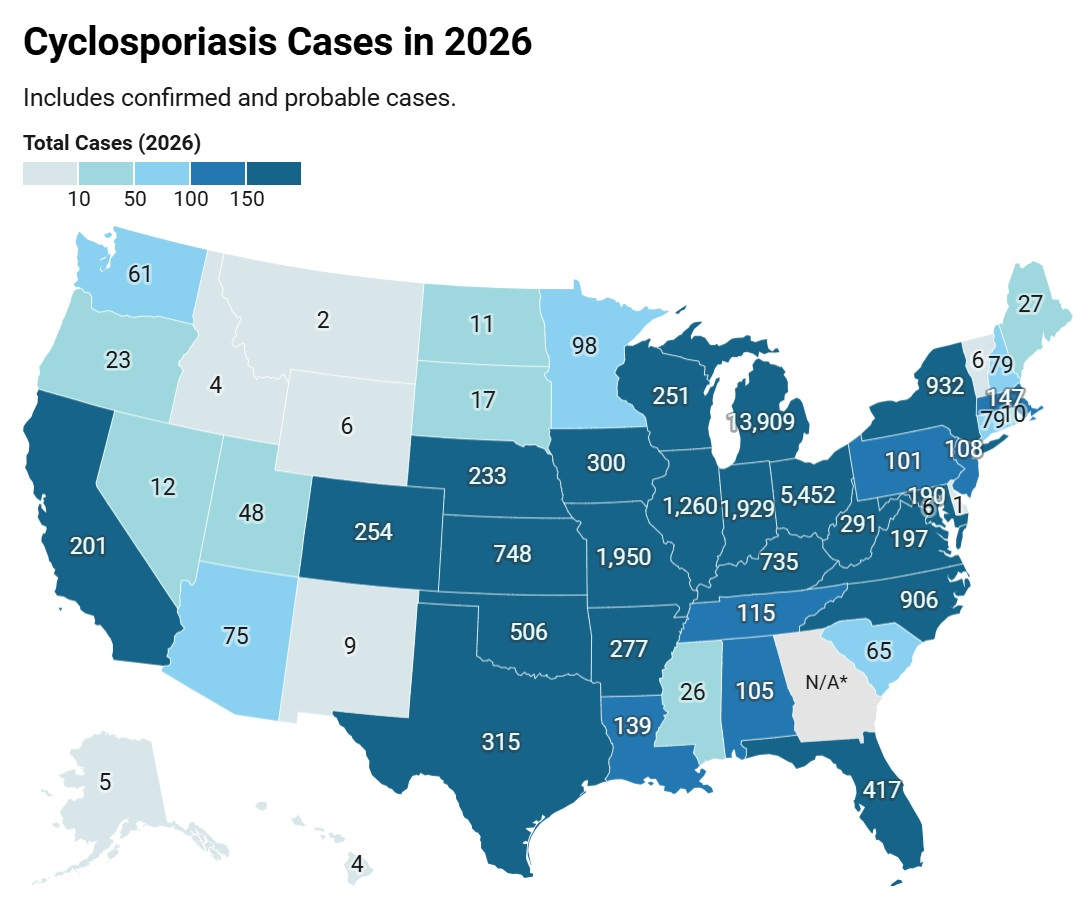
Cyclosporiasis cases in the USA as of August 20th, 2026.

Summertime outbreaks of cyclosporiasis have occurred frequently in the United States since at least the 2010s, although earlier outbreaks have also occurred, such as a 1990 outbreak in Chicago caused by contaminated tap water. Between 2018 and 2021, about 6,000 endemically acquired cases of cyclosporiasis were diagnosed and tracked by the Centers for Disease Control and Prevention (CDC).

In the United States, Cyclospora prevalence was tracked through the Foodborne Diseases Active Surveillance Network (FoodNet) system until 2025, when budget cuts resulted in the CDC no longer mandating reporting of the disease.

Outbreaks in the U.S. have been linked to consumption of fresh produce, mainly imported but also domestic.

==== Foodborne outbreaks 2000–2014 ====
Although Cyclospora initially was thought to be confined to tropical and subtropical regions, cyclosporiasis outbreaks are becoming more frequent in North America. According to the CDC, at least 11 documented cyclosporiasis outbreaks have occurred in the U.S. and Canada since the 1990s. The CDC also recorded 1,110 laboratory-confirmed sporadic instances of cyclosporiasis from 1997 to 2008.

Foodborne outbreaks of cyclosporiasis have been linked to various types of imported fresh produce, including raspberries, basil, snow peas, mesclun lettuce, and cilantro; no commercially frozen produce has been implicated to date. U.S. foodborne outbreaks of cyclosporiasis that occurred before 2000 were summarized previously, as were the major documented outbreaks in 2013 and 2014. Foodborne outbreaks during 2000–2014 are summarized in the table. The table provides information about 31 reported foodborne outbreaks of cyclosporiasis that occurred in the United States during 2000–2014; the total case count was 1,562. No outbreaks were reported in 2003, 2007, or 2010. Overall, a median of two outbreaks were reported per year, with a median of 20 cases per outbreak (range, 3 to 582 cases). Although the outbreaks occurred during eight months (December through July), the peak months were May, June, and July. As indicated in the table, a food vehicle of infection was identified for 15 of the 31 outbreaks.

Summary of U.S. foodborne outbreaks of cyclosporiasis, 2000–2014
| Year(s)* | Month(s)* | Jurisdiction(s)* | No. of cases† | Food vehicle and source, if identified‡ |
|---|---|---|---|---|
| 2000 | May | Georgia | 19 | Raspberries and/or blackberries (suspected) |
| 2000 | June | Pennsylvania | 54 | Raspberries |
| 2001 | January–February | Florida | 39 | |
| 2001 | January | New York City | 3 | |
| 2001–02 | December–January | Vermont | 22 | Raspberries (likely) |
| 2002 | April–May | Massachusetts | 8 | |
| 2002 | June | New York | 14 | |
| 2004 | February | Texas | 38 | |
| 2004 | February | Illinois | 57 | Basil (likely) |
| 2004 | May | Tennessee | 12 | |
| 2004 | May–June | Pennsylvania | 96 | Snow peas from Guatemala |
| 2005 | March–May | Florida | 582 | Basil from Peru |
| 2005 | May | South Carolina | 6 | |
| 2005 | April | Massachusetts | 58 | |
| 2005 | May | Massachusetts | 16 | |
| 2005 | June | Connecticut | 30 | Basil (suspected) |
| 2006 | June | Minnesota | 14 | |
| 2006 | June | New York | 20 | |
| 2006 | July | Georgia | 3 | |
| 2008 | March | Wisconsin | 4 | Sugar snap peas (likely) |
| 2008 | July | California | 45 | Raspberries and/or blackberries (likely) |
| 2009 | June | District of Columbia | 34 | |
| 2011 | June | Florida | 12 | |
| 2011 | July | Georgia | 100 | |
| 2012 | June–July | Texas | 16 | |
| 2013** | June | Iowa and Nebraska | 161 | Bagged salad mix from Mexico |
| 2013** | June–July | Texas | 38 | Cilantro from Mexico |
| 2013 | July | Wisconsin | 8 | Berry salad (suspected) |
| 2014 | June | Michigan | 14 | |
| 2014†† | June–July | Texas | 26 | Cilantro from Mexico |
| 2014 | July | South Carolina | 13 | |

* The entries in the first three columns refer to the known or likely year(s), month(s), and jurisdiction(s) in which the exposure(s) to Cyclospora occurred.

** For additional details, see summary information about the outbreak investigations in 2013. For the purposes of this table, the exposure month(s) and case counts are limited to those explicitly linked in the investigations to the food item specified in the last column.

† The case counts include laboratory-confirmed and probable cases of cyclosporiasis. By definition, each outbreak included at least two linked cases, at least one of which was laboratory confirmed.

‡ A food vehicle is specified only if a single ingredient or commodity was identified in an outbreak investigation.

¶ Cases that occurred in Canadian travelers to the United States were not included.

†† For additional perspective, see summary information about outbreak investigations in 2014. For this table, the exposure months and the case count for the outbreak in Texas are limited to those explicitly linked in the investigations to the food item specified in the last column.

===== 2013 outbreak =====
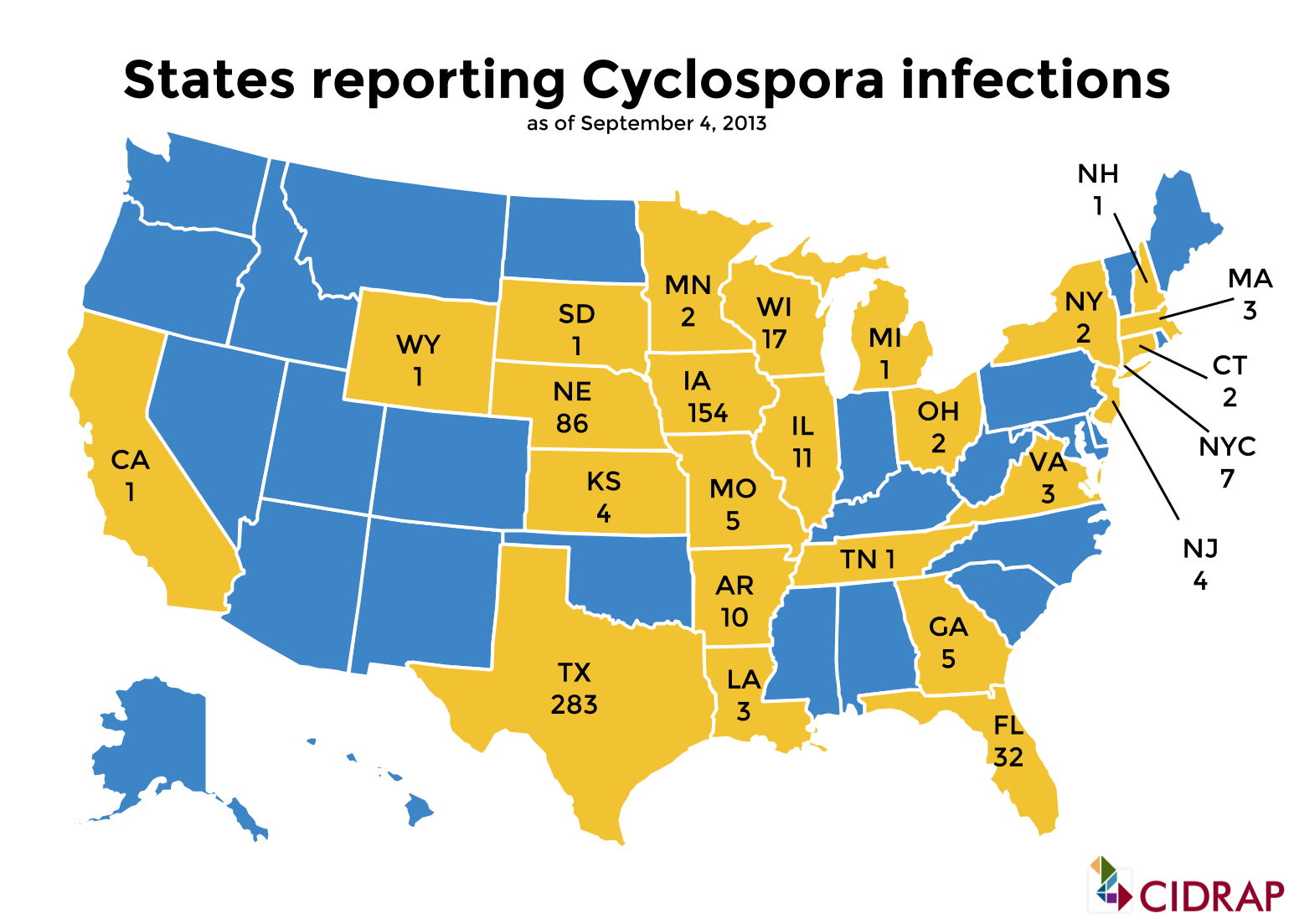
Map of states reporting Cyclospora infections as of August 19, 2013, from CIDRAP

Between June and August 2013, multiple independent outbreaks of the disease in the U.S. sickened at least 631 people across 25 states.

At least 285 people in 11 states had been infected as of July 26, 2013. The exact cause of the outbreak had not yet been identified, according to the CDC. Most cases were located in the Midwest, with 138 reported cases in Iowa and 70 in Nebraska. The other states affected are Texas, Florida, Georgia, Wisconsin, Connecticut, Illinois, Kansas, Minnesota, New Jersey, and Ohio.

As of July 29, 2013, the CDC reported 373 people in 15 states had been affected by the outbreak, and 21 patients from three states had been hospitalized, with no deaths reported. No food source had been identified, but health officials in Iowa—the state reporting the most cases—said they suspected imported vegetables.

On July 30, 2013, the Nebraska Department of Health & Human Services and the Iowa Department of Health announced that a restaurant chain's packaged salad was the disease vector for the parasite. However, the CDC and the U.S. Food and Drug Administration (FDA) continued to assess information from other states to see if the findings applied to illnesses there.

In an August 1, 2013, update, the CDC reported 397 cases, while Iowa and Texas added another 22 more. This pushed the unofficial count to over 400 cases. Additionally, Louisiana reported its first case, bringing the total number of states affected to 16.

On August 3, 2013, CNN reported that the outbreak was traced to packaged salad served at Olive Garden and Red Lobster restaurants that was manufactured by Taylor Farms de Mexico.

On August 15, 2013, the CDC reported nine more Cyclospora infections, raising its case count to 548. The number of affected states remained at 19, but the CDC said that not all cases were confirmed to be linked to an outbreak in Iowa and Nebraska traced to a contaminated salad mix from Mexico.

On August 19, 2013, the CDC reported 10 more Cyclospora cases, raising the unofficial count to over 600. Tennessee also reported its first case, bringing the number of states affected to 20. The CDC still cautions that whether cases in all states are related to outbreaks in Iowa and Nebraska remains unclear.

As of August 27, 2013, the origin of the outbreak remained a mystery. The FDA said it found no food safety violations at the Taylor Farms de Mexico salad plant that was linked to some of the illnesses. Investigations later identified a bagged salad mixture as the cause of an outbreak in Iowa and Nebraska.

==== 2015 Texas outbreak ====
In 2015, the CDC was notified of 546 persons with confirmed cyclosporiasis infection across 31 states. Cluster investigations in Texas, where the greatest number of infections was reported, indicated that contaminated cilantro was the culprit.

In an FDA statement, the CDC is quoted, "there is currently (in July 2015) another ongoing outbreak of cyclosporiasis in the United States in which both the Texas Department of State Health Services and the Wisconsin Department of Health Services and the Wisconsin Department of Agriculture, Trade and Consumer Protection have identified cilantro from the Mexican state of Puebla as a suspect vehicle with respect to separate illness clusters." Last year, Texas had 200 cases, some of which were associated with cilantro from the Puebla region.

==== 2016 Texas outbreak ====
Health officials said more than a dozen cases of cyclosporiasis had been confirmed in North Texas's four major counties and that the source was likely contaminated food. The Texas Department of State Health Services said Wednesday the parasite was found in Dallas, Tarrant, Collin, and Denton Counties and that the origin may have been linked to a fresh produce item.

County officials told NBC 5 that four cases were recorded in Dallas County, three in Collin County, four in Denton County, and seven in Tarrant County. The Denton County cases and at least four of the Tarrant County cases had recently traveled out of the country, calling into question the point of origin.

Across the state, 66 cases of cyclosporiasis were confirmed, though the sources of infection were unconfirmed. For most people, the symptoms were not serious. "But for those who are very young and those who are older, or those who have a suppressed immune system, this illness can cause major problems," said Khang Tran, chief medical officer at the Medical Center of Plano. In recent years, 2012–2015, Cyclospora outbreaks were associated with fresh cilantro imported from Puebla, Mexico. Since the summer of 2015, the Food and Drug Administration has instituted a ban on imports from that region from April through August.

==== 2018 outbreaks ====
On July 31, 2018, the United States Department of Agriculture (USDA) issued a public health alert for certain beef, pork, and poultry salad and wrap products potentially contaminated with Cyclospora. The contamination came from the chopped romaine lettuce used in these products.

Del Monte recalled packaged Del Monte Fresh Produce vegetable trays containing broccoli, carrots, cauliflower, celery sticks, and dill dip, from certain retailers, including Kwik Trip and Peapod, according to the CDC. Residents in Iowa, Michigan, Minnesota, and Wisconsin got sick from Cyclospora.

McDonald's stopped selling salads supplied by Fresh Express at some 3,000 locations across the country mostly in the Midwestern United States due to a multistate parasite outbreak caused by Cyclospora that had sickened 551 people.

==== 2020 Midwestern outbreak ====
In June 2020, the CDC and other regulatory bodies began investigating an outbreak of cyclosporiasis in the Midwest United States linked to bagged salad mix. On June 27, 2020, Fresh Express announced a voluntary recall of over 91 Fresh Express and private-label salad products.

==== 2026 summer outbreak ====
In 2026, between May 1 and June 16, at least 145 cases of cyclosporiasis were reported across 17 U.S. states, prompting public health officials to investigate potential links to contaminated fresh produce, with the highest case counts reported in New York, Illinois, and Texas. In early July 2026, the CDC identified at least eight additional cyclosporiasis clusters in Alabama, Kentucky, Michigan, Ohio, Pennsylvania, Tennessee, Virginia, and West Virginia. Case interviews for these clusters were still pending, and the agency cautioned that investigations remained in their early stages. By July 14, the disease had spread to 34 states and infected nearly 7,000 people. On July 15, the disease was reported in Canada, specifically with Quebec registering 85 cases. By July 22, more than 11,500 people have been infected in 41 states.

Michigan health officials reported that epidemiologic evidence suggests lettuce or other leafy salad greens may be the source of a large cyclosporiasis outbreak that began in mid-June 2026. By July 13, the outbreak had resulted in 2,640 confirmed cases and 44 hospitalizations, representing a substantial increase over reports from the previous week and marking the largest annual cyclosporiasis outbreak ever recorded in the state. Cases are concentrated in the state's southeast, particularly Wayne County, home to Detroit. Natasha Bagdasarian, Michigan's chief medical executive, described the case count as a "moving target" likely to keep rising. Michigan typically reports roughly 40 to 50 cases of the disease each year. Investigators continued efforts to identify the specific contaminated food source and determine the extent of the outbreak.

Separately, federal officials were investigating earlier clusters in Illinois, New York (including New York City), Pennsylvania, and Texas that appeared linked to Mexican restaurants, a grocery chain, and a catered event, according to an internal CDC email obtained by CNN.

Federal health officials identified contaminated lettuce served at Taco Bell locations in Indiana, Kentucky, Michigan, Ohio, and West Virginia as a source of the outbreak, although experts noted that not every illness is necessarily from a single source. The agricultural company Taylor Farms later voluntarily recalled several products containing iceberg lettuce sold in 27 states that had a potential link to the cyclosporiasis outbreak.

In late July, the FDA started investigating a new, separate cyclospora outbreak that has sickened at least 72 people, distinct from the ongoing, larger lettuce-related outbreak. The source of this specific cluster has not yet been identified.

On October 22, 2026, further FDA investigations revealed the presence of cyclospora in farms and processing facilities that provided the lettuce distributed by Taylor Farms. Positive samples were found in a tank holding outgoing wastewater and a drainage ditch. The presence of positive samples further corroborates the link between the Taylor Farms' distribution to the outbreak.

===== By state =====
| State | Cases | Hospitalizations | Deaths | Remarks |
|---|---|---|---|---|
| Arkansas | 92 | | | |
| Connecticut | 56 | | | |
| Illinois | 1,260 | 65 | | |
| Kentucky | 100 | | | The state typically reports 35 cases a year. |
| Louisiana | 79 | | | |
| Michigan | 11,234 | 193 | 2 | |
| Missouri | 1,095 | | | |
| New Hampshire | 69 | 3 | | |
| New York | 511 | | | |
| North Carolina | 561 | | | |
| Ohio | 177 | 28 | | |
| Oklahoma | 303 | | | |
| Pennsylvania | 101 | | | |
| Texas | 68 | 15 | | |
| Virginia | 162 | | | |
| West Virginia | 47 | | | |

==== Difficulty in tracing origin ====
Investigators noted that cyclosporiasis is unusually difficult to trace to a single source. Unlike bacterial pathogens such as E. coli or Salmonella, which can be matched to contaminated food through DNA sequencing via the PulseNet surveillance network, Cyclospora cannot be cultured in a lab, and its sexual reproduction cycle causes its genetic profile to vary significantly between generations. Max Teplitski, former head of the USDA's Division of Food Safety, noted these traits make source attribution considerably harder than with typical foodborne pathogens. The CDC has increasingly relied on genotyping to group cases into likely strains, though officials say this method still lacks the precision achieved with other pathogens.
