= Marketing failure =

Marketing failure is when a commercial marketing effort by a business fails to accomplish anything positive, or alternately when a commercial product is either totally or mostly rejected by its potential customers.

== Overview ==
Marketing researchers have distinguished between outcome and process failures. An outcome failure is a failure to obtain a good or service at all; a process failure is a failure to receive the good or service in an appropriate or preferable way. Thus, a person who is only interested in the outcome of an activity would consider it to be an outcome failure if the core issue has not been resolved or a core need is not met. A process failure occurs, by contrast, when, although the activity is completed successfully, the customer still perceives the way in which the activity is conducted to be below an expected standard or benchmark.

Wan and Chan note that outcome and process failures are associated with different kinds of detrimental effects to the consumer. They observe that "[a]n outcome failure involves a loss of economic resources (i.e., money, time) and a process failure involves a loss of social resources (i.e., social esteem)".

== Examples ==
=== Edsel ===
Edsel is a discontinued division and brand of automobiles that was produced by the Ford Motor Company in the 1958 to 1960 model years. Deriving its name from Edsel Ford, son of company founder Henry Ford, Edsels were developed in an effort to give Ford a fourth brand to gain additional market share from Chrysler and General Motors. Established as an expansion of the Lincoln–Mercury Division to three brands, re-christened the Mercury–Edsel–Lincoln Division, Edsel shared a price range with Mercury. The division shared its bodies with both Mercury and Ford. Competing against Buick, Oldsmobile, Pontiac, Dodge, and DeSoto, Edsel was the first new brand introduced by an American automaker since the 1939 launch of Mercury and 1956 launch of Continental, which ended and merged into Lincoln after 1957. In the year leading to its release, Ford invested in an advertising campaign, marketing Edsels as the cars of the future.

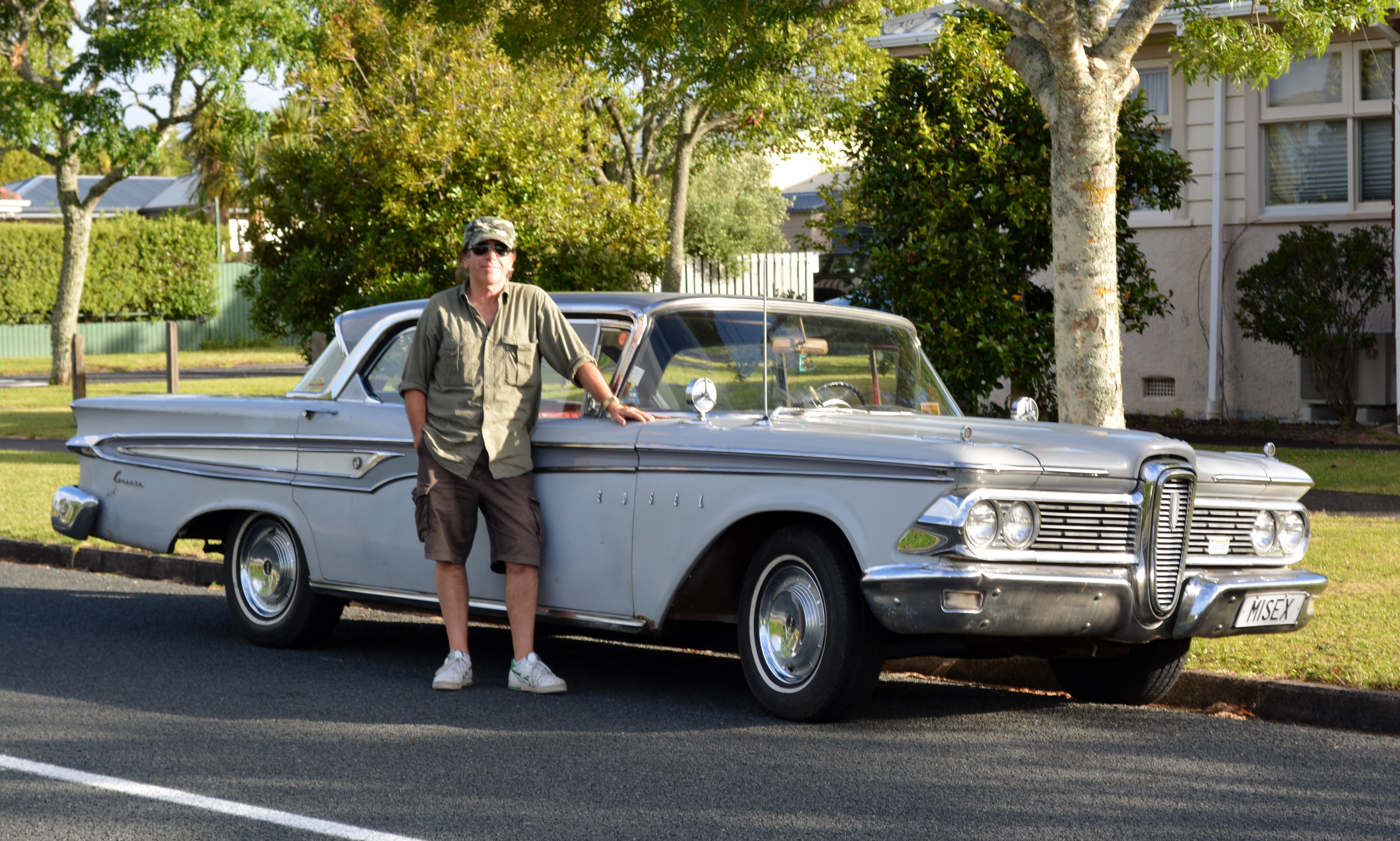
A 1959 Edsel Corsair

While 1958 Edsels introduced multiple advanced features for the price segment, the launch of the model line became symbolic of commercial failure. Introduced in a recession that catastrophically affected sales of medium-priced cars, Edsels were considered overhyped, unattractive, distinguished by a vertical grille said to resemble a horse collar, and low quality. Following a loss of over $250 million$, 2.66 billion in 2024 dollars, on development, manufacturing, and marketing on the model line, Ford quietly discontinued the Edsel brand before 1960.

=== Third-Pound Burger ===
In the 1980s, A&W, under then-owner A. Alfred Taubman, sought to challenge McDonald's highly successful Quarter Pounder by introducing a larger, higher-quality hamburger. The campaign, called "Third is the Word," was designed to promote A&W's third-pound burger as a better value for the same price as McDonald's quarter-pound burger. Despite the promise of more meat for the same price, the campaign failed to resonate with consumers.

Taubman recounted the experience in his book, Threshold Resistance. He described how the company aggressively marketed the third-pound burger through TV and radio promotional spots, but sales remained lackluster. Confused as to why the burger was not selling, Taubman hired a market research firm to conduct a study.

The A&W research firm organized focus groups to understand why A&W's third-pound burgers weren't competing well with McDonald's Quarter Pounders. The results revealed a surprising source of consumer resistance: many participants mistakenly believed that one-third of a pound was smaller than one-fourth (quarter) of a pound. Focus group participants expressed confusion over the price, asking why they should pay the same amount for a "smaller" third-pound burger.

This misunderstanding stemmed from consumers focusing on the numbers "3" and "4," leading them to conclude that one-third (1/3) was smaller than one-fourth (1/4), even though the opposite is true.

A similar account was reported by The New York Times in 2014, which cited the A&W third-pound burger as one of the most vivid examples of consumer arithmetic failure. In taste tests, customers actually preferred A&W's third-pound burger to McDonald's Quarter Pounder, and it was less expensive. However, consumers misunderstood the fraction, believing they were being overcharged for a smaller burger.

According to a CBC report, more than half of the people surveyed about the burger said they didn't buy it because they thought they were getting less meat for the same price as McDonald's Quarter Pounder. The New York Times echoed this sentiment, noting that the larger number "4" in "¼" confused customers, making them think it was a better deal than "⅓".

== See also ==
=== Concepts ===
General concepts

- Direct marketing
- Failure
- Multi-level marketing
- Marketing mix
- Marketing strategy
- Marketing myopia

Related concepts

- Box-office
- Tragedy of the commons

=== Examples ===
- Third-Pound Burger
- RadioShack
- John Carter (film)
- Edsel
