= Death of James Yoo =

2023 explosion in Arlington, Virginia, US

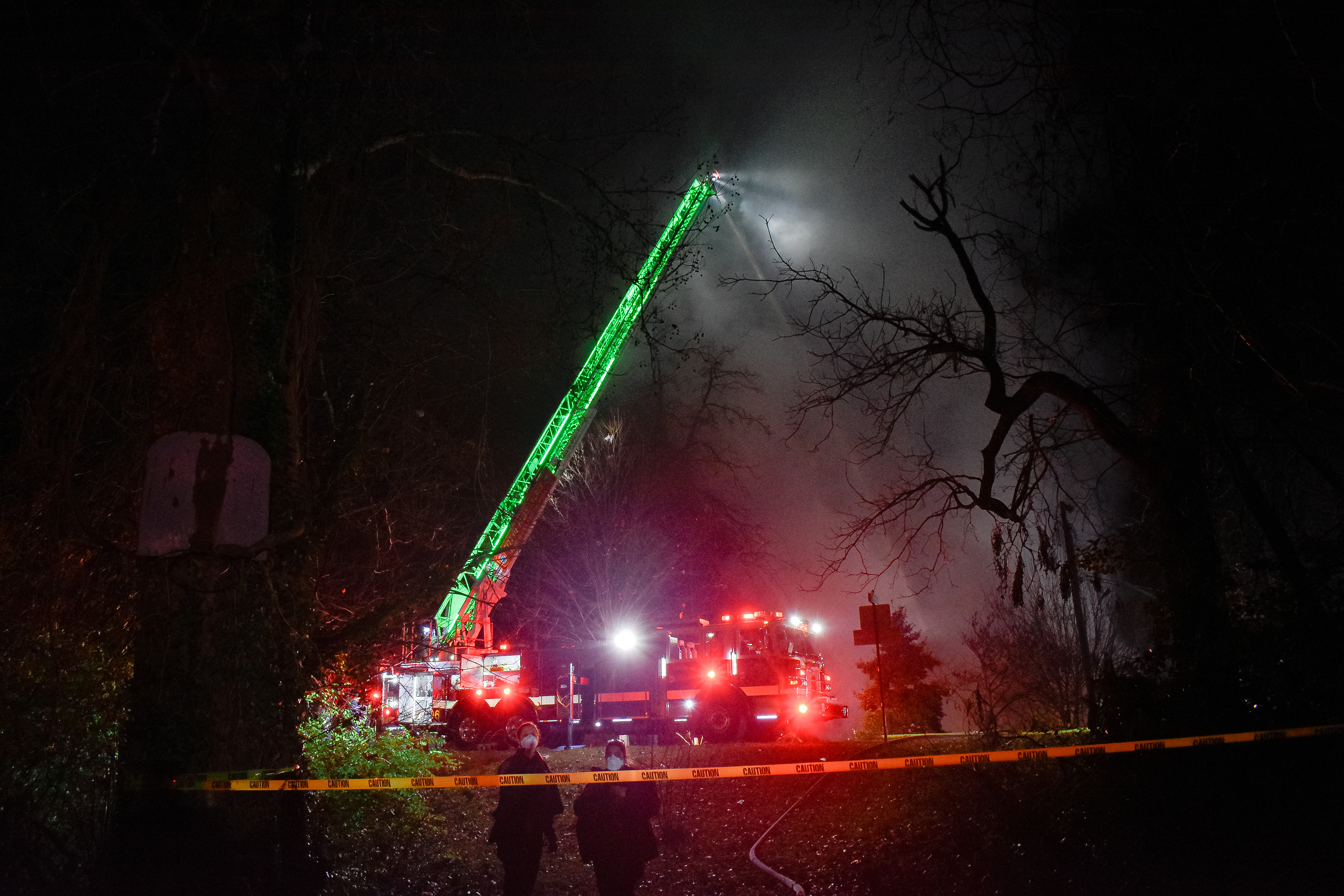
Aftermath of the explosion, Falls Church Tower Truck 106 pictured fighting the resulting fire.

On December 4, 2023, the Arlington, Virginia house of 56-year-old James W. Yoo exploded, with Yoo being found dead inside. Investigators determined the explosion to have been intentionally caused by Yoo, trying to attempt to lure policemen in. The incident received national and international coverage.

== Event ==
In the leadup to the event, neighbors reported Yoo stockpiling lighter fluid, charcoal and bleach, as well as covering up the windows of his house. Yoo, who had recently gone through a contentious divorce requiring him to sell his home, had over the years filed multiple legal claims accusing people of stalking, threatening or harassing him, though these claims were consistently thrown out by courts. He also had a history of complaining to the FBI that he was a fraud victim. Yoo regularly posted rants on social media accusing his neighbors of being spies, and containing conspiracy theories about United States government agencies, law enforcement and media outlets.

On December 4, 2023, Yoo began firing a flare gun outside his window, doing so 30 to 40 times. Police attempted to make contact with Yoo but were unsuccessful, and Yoo subsequently fired several rounds from an apparent firearm from his house. At around 8:25pm, the house exploded with Yoo inside. Three officers suffered minor injuries, though there were no other casualties. The blast was seen across Arlington. The Arlington County Fire Department then fought the resulting fire for several hours. The family of four who had lived on the other side of the destroyed duplex raised nearly $250,000 on GoFundMe.

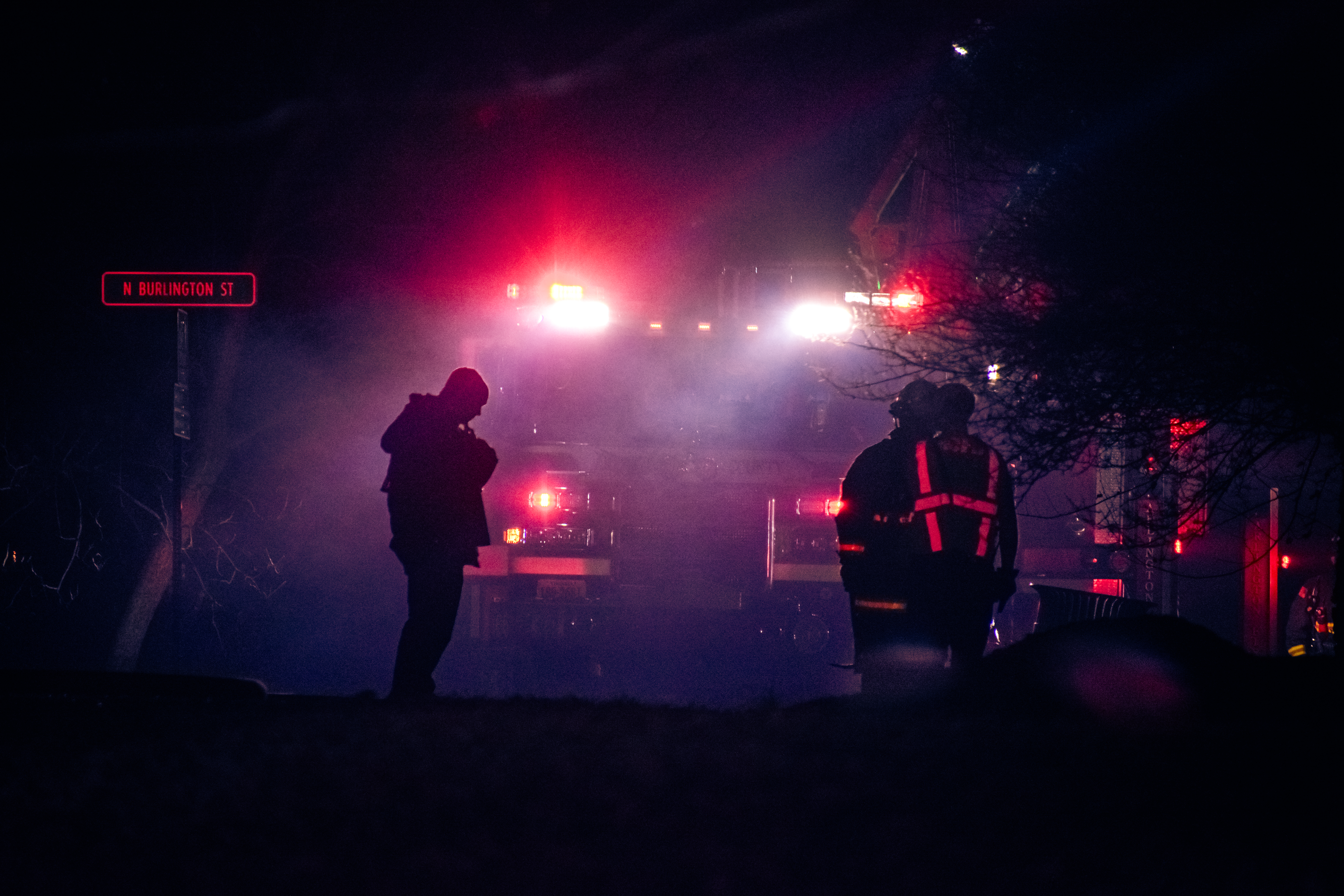
Firefighters in front of Tower 106 on North Burlington Street

== Investigation ==
In June 2024 investigators determined that Yoo had intentionally caused the explosion by using up to 35 gallons of gas. A concrete motive has not been established.
