= Arlington Fire =

Arlington Fire may refer to:

- Arlington Fire District - The fire district that provides fire protection to the Town of Poughkeepsie
- Arlington County Fire Department - A county wide fire district in Arlington County, Virginia
