= Redonkadonk =

Portland sandwich variety

- Type: Sandwich
- Place of origin: United States
- Region or state: Oregon
- Main ingredients: Grilled cheese sandwiches, ham, bacon, cheese, eggs, Spam

Redonkadonk is a grilled burger with ham, bacon, cheese, egg and Spam inside two grilled cheese sandwiches made with extra-thick Texas toast style bread. It was served by Portland, Oregon's Brunch Box food cart and restaurants. Brunch Box operated in Portland for 12 years, first as a food cart in downtown Portland and then two additional brick and mortar locations in the city; the business permanently closed in September 2021.

It has been identified as one of the fattiest foods in the U.S. by Health.com The sandwich is featured on the Cooking Channel's Eat St. show in its second episode. The Cooking Channel includes the recipe on its website.

The Redonkadonk competed on Portland's food truck and food cart scene against the Big-A** Sandwich's Gutbomb: "a basic Big-A** with double the meat, double the cheese and the girth of a fishbowl", as well as the Original Cheesus from the Grilled Cheese Grill: a Colby Jack and grilled onion grilled cheese sandwich and an American cheese grilled cheese sandwich with pickles encasing a one-third pound burger with lettuce, tomato, ketchup and mustard.

== See also ==
- List of sandwiches
