= Trent Morse =

American political operative (born 1991)

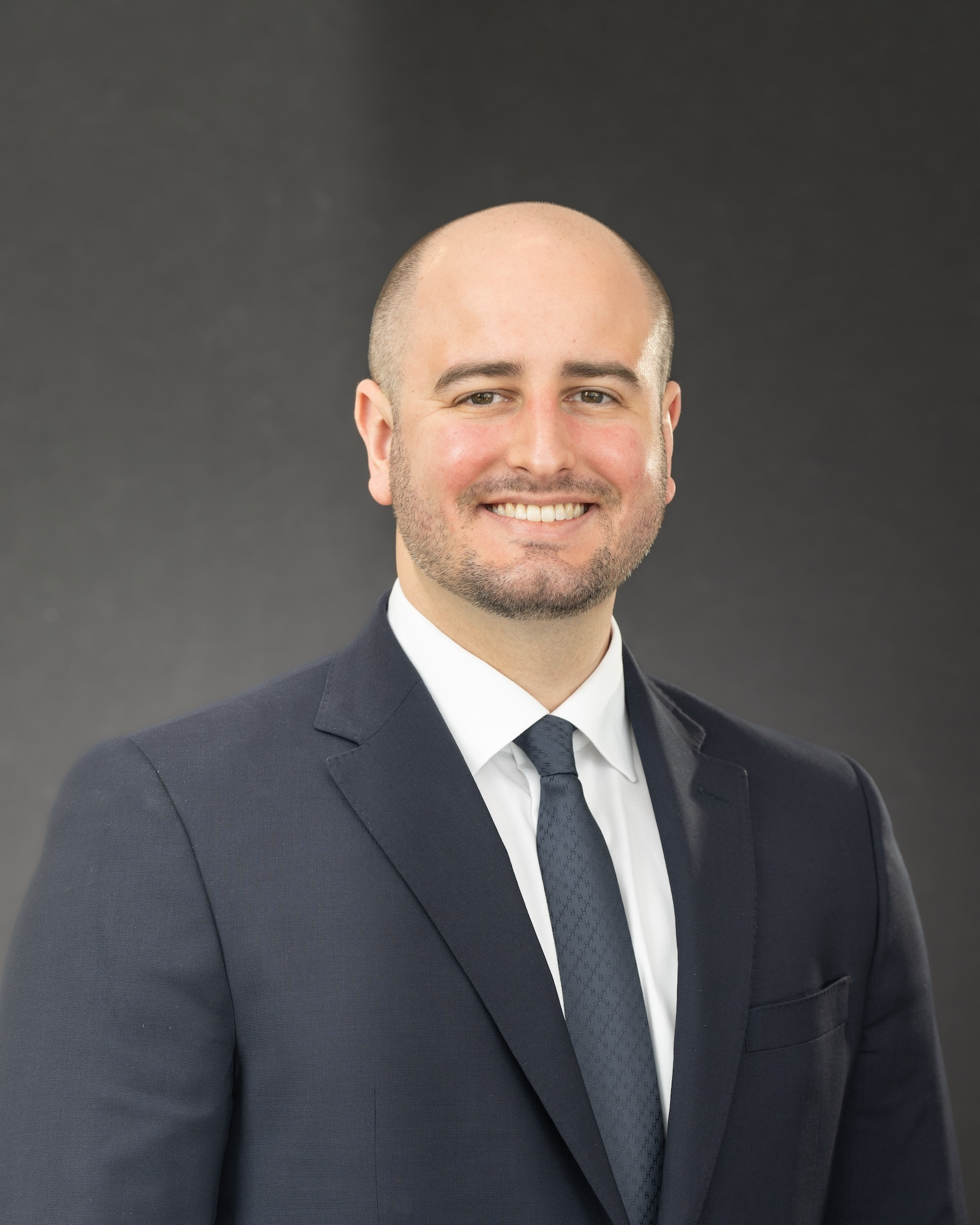
- Official portrait, 2026

Member of the Metropolitan Washington Airports Authority Board of Directors
- Incumbent
- Assuming office January 21, 2026
- Appointed by: Donald Trump
- Succeeding: Sean Burton

Deputy Director of the White House Presidential Personnel Office
- In office January 20, 2025 – September 2, 2025
- President: Donald Trump
- Director: Sergio Gor
- Preceded by: Stacey Eichner
- Succeeded by: Morgan DeWitt-Snow

Personal details
- Born: Trent Michael Morse; April 19, 1991 (age 35) Tampa, Florida, U.S.
- Party: Republican
- Education: Florida State University (BS, JD)

Trent Michael Morse (born April 19, 1991) is an American political operative and lobbyist who served as the deputy director of the White House Presidential Personnel Office from January to September 2025.

Morse graduated from Florida State University with a bachelor's degree and from the university's College of Law with a Juris Doctor. While in law school, he worked on Donald Trump's 2016 presidential campaign. Morse served in several government positions after graduating, including the Florida Department of Transportation, a transportation and infrastructure holding company, the Florida Governor's Office, and the United States Department of Transportation as a special assistant. In July 2018, Morse became the United States Department of Health and Human Services's liaison to the Trump administration. He was central in secretary of health and human services Alex Azar's efforts to assume greater control over the department.

In March 2020, Morse was hired by Ballard Partners. He was the host committee president for the 2020 Republican National Convention, after Jacksonville, Florida, was awarded the convention, and the campaign manager for Tudor Dixon's campaign in the 2022 Michigan gubernatorial election. In January 2023, Morse became a senior vice president of Mercury Public Affairs. He led outreach at the 2024 Republican National Convention and was involved in the Trump's second presidential transition. In January 2025, Trump named Morse as the deputy director of the White House Presidential Personnel Office. He led Trump's efforts to fire members of commissions and boards. Morse resigned in September to form his own lobbying firm, Morse Strategies, and to serve as a senior strategic advisor to Brownstein Hyatt Farber Schreck.

== Early life and education (1991–2017) ==
Trent Michael Morse was born on April 19, 1991, in Tampa, Florida. Morse attended Walker Middle Magnet School and Hillsborough High School. At Hillsborough, he swam and was a participant in the Poynter Institute's High School Journalism Program. Morse graduated from Florida State University with a bachelor's degree and from the university's College of Law with a Juris Doctor in 2017. While in law school, Morse worked on Donald Trump's 2016 presidential campaign. He is gay.

== Career ==
=== Policy advisor and White House liaison (2017–2020) ===
By August 2017, Morse had worked at the Florida Department of Transportation, a transportation and infrastructure holding company, and the Florida Governor's Office. That month, Morse began working at the United States Department of Transportation as a special assistant. In July 2018, Morse succeeded Tim Clark as the United States Department of Health and Human Services's liaison to the Trump administration after serving as a senior policy advisor to Pam Patenaude, the deputy secretary of housing and urban development. At the Department of Health and Human Services, Morse was central in secretary of health and human services Alex Azar's efforts to assume greater control over the department.

=== Lobbying and political work (2020–2025) ===
In March 2020, Morse was hired by Ballard Partners; an ethics pledge initially prevented Morse from lobbying the Trump administration until it elapsed. He was president of the Host Committee for the 2020 Republican National Convention, after Jacksonville, Florida, was awarded the convention. In August 2022, Morse was appointed as the campaign manager for Tudor Dixon's campaign in that year's gubernatorial election. In January 2023, he became a senior vice president of Mercury Public Affairs, a bipartisan political strategy and consulting firm. Morse led outreach at the 2024 Republican National Convention and was involved in the second presidential transition of Donald Trump.

=== Deputy director of the White House Presidential Personnel Office (January–September 2025) ===
On January 20, 2025, Morse was appointed as the deputy director of the White House Presidential Personnel Office. As deputy director, he requested resignation letters from three members of the Privacy and Civil Liberties Oversight Board appointed by Democrats, notified twelve inspectors general that they had been fired, and informed members of the Merit Systems Protection Board that they had been fired. His firing of the United States Institute of Peace's board members began a federal takeover effort.

Morse sent letters of dismissal to Nuclear Regulatory Commission chairman Christopher T. Hanson, librarian of Congress Carla Hayden, three of the Democratic-appointed members of the Corporation for Public Broadcasting's board, and two of the Democratic-appointed commissioners on the Federal Trade Commission. He sent emails to the three presidential appointees on the National Capital Planning Commission, firing them amid a conflict between president Donald Trump and Federal Reserve chairman Jerome Powell over expansions to the Eccles Building. The firings served as the basis for the commission's review of the expansions, giving Trump the pretext to fire Powell. In August 2025, Politico reported that Morse was resigning to found his own lobbying firm, Morse Strategies, and to serve as a senior strategic advisor to Brownstein Hyatt Farber Schreck. He was hired by Taylor Farms in 2026.

=== Member of the Metropolitan Washington Airports Authority board of directors ===
After resigning from the White House Presidential Personnel Office, Trump nominated Morse to serve on the board of directors for the Metropolitan Washington Airports Authority. He appeared before the Senate Committee on Commerce, Science, and Transportation on November 12. Morse signaled that he would vote to remove the mobile lounges at Dulles International Airport. He was confirmed 53–43 on December 18, 2025. He subsequently took office January 21, 2026.

== Works cited ==
=== Articles ===
- "Ballard Partners' DC operation adds another White House alum". Florida Politics. March 2, 2020. Archived from the original on August 23, 2025.
- "Class 2A-District 8". The Tampa Tribune. October 21, 2007. Archived from the original on August 22, 2025.
- Diamond, Dan (July 13, 2018). "Officials depart HHS after incendiary social media posts". Politico. Archived from the original on March 23, 2023.
- Diamond, Dan (July 16, 2018). "Alex Azar is consolidating power". Politico. Archived from the original on November 17, 2023.
- Diamond, Dan (November 12, 2025). "Trump airport nominee wants to eliminate Dulles 'people movers'". The Washington Post. Archived from the original on November 13, 2025.
- Cancryn, Adam; Diamond, Dan (March 2, 2020). "Coronavirus cases keep coming". Politico. Archived from the original on December 13, 2020.
- Haberman, Maggie; Savage, Charlie; Karni, Annie (January 24, 2025). "Trump Fires at Least 12 Inspectors General in Late-Night Purge". The New York Times. Archived from the original on February 23, 2025.
- Halper, Evan (June 16, 2025). "Trump fires nuclear regulator as White House seeks to soften oversight". The Washington Post. Archived from the original on July 26, 2025.
- Kavi, Aishvarya (March 24, 2025). "Showdown at the Institute of Peace". The New York Times. Archived from the original on September 22, 2025.
- Mattioli, Dana; Michaels, Dave (March 18, 2025). "Trump Fires Two Democratic FTC Commissioners". The Washington Post. Archived from the original on May 28, 2025.
- McCreesh, Shawn (August 26, 2025). "Donald Trump's Big Gay Government". The New York Times. Archived from the original on August 26, 2025.
- Mendenhall, Mike (July 22, 2020). "RNC host committee president: The convention 'is going to happen'". Jacksonville Daily Record. Archived from the original on May 12, 2025.
- Mullin, Benjamin (April 29, 2025). "Corporation for Public Broadcasting Sues White House to Block Board Firings". The New York Times. Archived from the original on August 3, 2025.
- Nguyen, Sophia; Scribner, Herb (May 8, 2025). "Trump fires Library of Congress chief Carla Hayden, citing DEI". The Washington Post. Archived from the original on May 15, 2025.
- Oprysko, Caitlin (August 17, 2022). "Senators press DOJ on Brookings' FARA compliance". Politico. Archived from the original on June 6, 2023.
- Oprysko, Caitlin (January 20, 2025). "Litigation funding group gets a new leader". Politico. Archived from the original on May 24, 2025.
- Oprysko, Caitlin (August 19, 2025). "Senior WH aide first to decamp for K Street". Politico. Archived from the original on August 21, 2025.
- Rappeport, Alan (July 18, 2025). "Trump's War With Powell Throws a Little-Known Planning Board Into Scrutiny". Politico. Archived from the original on September 8, 2025.
- Savage, Charlie (January 22, 2025). "Trump Seeks to Paralyze Independent Privacy and Civil Liberties Watchdog". The New York Times. Archived from the original on January 25, 2025.
- Solochek, Jeffrey (October 10, 2004). "Kids ease up on the 'us-them' mentality". St. Petersburg Times. Archived from the original on August 23, 2025.
- Wallace, Wendy (December 3, 2007). "Debate goes on". St. Petersburg Times.
- Weiland, Noah (February 13, 2025). "Trump Tests Legal Limits in Pushing Out Federal Employees". The New York Times. Archived from the original on August 22, 2025.
- Wilson, Drew (January 23, 2025). "Personnel note: Trent Morse snags White House post". Florida Politics. Archived from the original on January 24, 2025.
- Wilson, Drew (January 6, 2023). "Personnel note: Trent Morse joins Mercury as SVP". Florida Politics. Archived from the original on July 16, 2025.
- Williams, Zach (November 4, 2025). "Trump-Aligned Airline Lobbyist Seeks Seat on DC Airport Board". Bloomberg Government. Archived from the original on November 5, 2025.

=== Documents ===
- "Trent Michael Morse in the Florida, U.S., Voter Registration Records, 1942-2023" (Document). Voter Registration Records.
