= Al Bernardin =

American restaurateur and businessman

- Born: Alcide Eugene Bernardin; February 17, 1928; Lawrence, Massachusetts, U.S.
- Died: December 22, 2009 (aged 81); Monterey, California, U.S.
- Occupation(s): Businessman, business executive, McDonald's restaurant franchisee

Al Bernardin (February 17, 1928 – December 22, 2009) was an American restaurateur and businessman who invented the McDonald's Quarter Pounder in 1971 as a franchise owner in Fremont, California. The creation of the Quarter Pounder earned him the nickname "Fremont's hamburger king."

Bernardin, during the 1960s, was McDonald's vice president of product development. His position allowed him to play a key role in the development of some of the company's signature menu items, including frozen french fries, which allowed for easier storage and transportation, as well as the McDonald's fish sandwich, apple pie and cherry pie.

== McDonald's ==
Bernardin was born on February 17, 1928, in Lawrence, Massachusetts. He received his bachelor's degree from Cornell University in 1952.

He was first hired to work at McDonald's Illinois corporate headquarters in 1960. Bernardin was promoted to dean of the company's training center, Hamburger University, within just six months of joining McDonald's.

=== Development of the Quarter Pounder ===
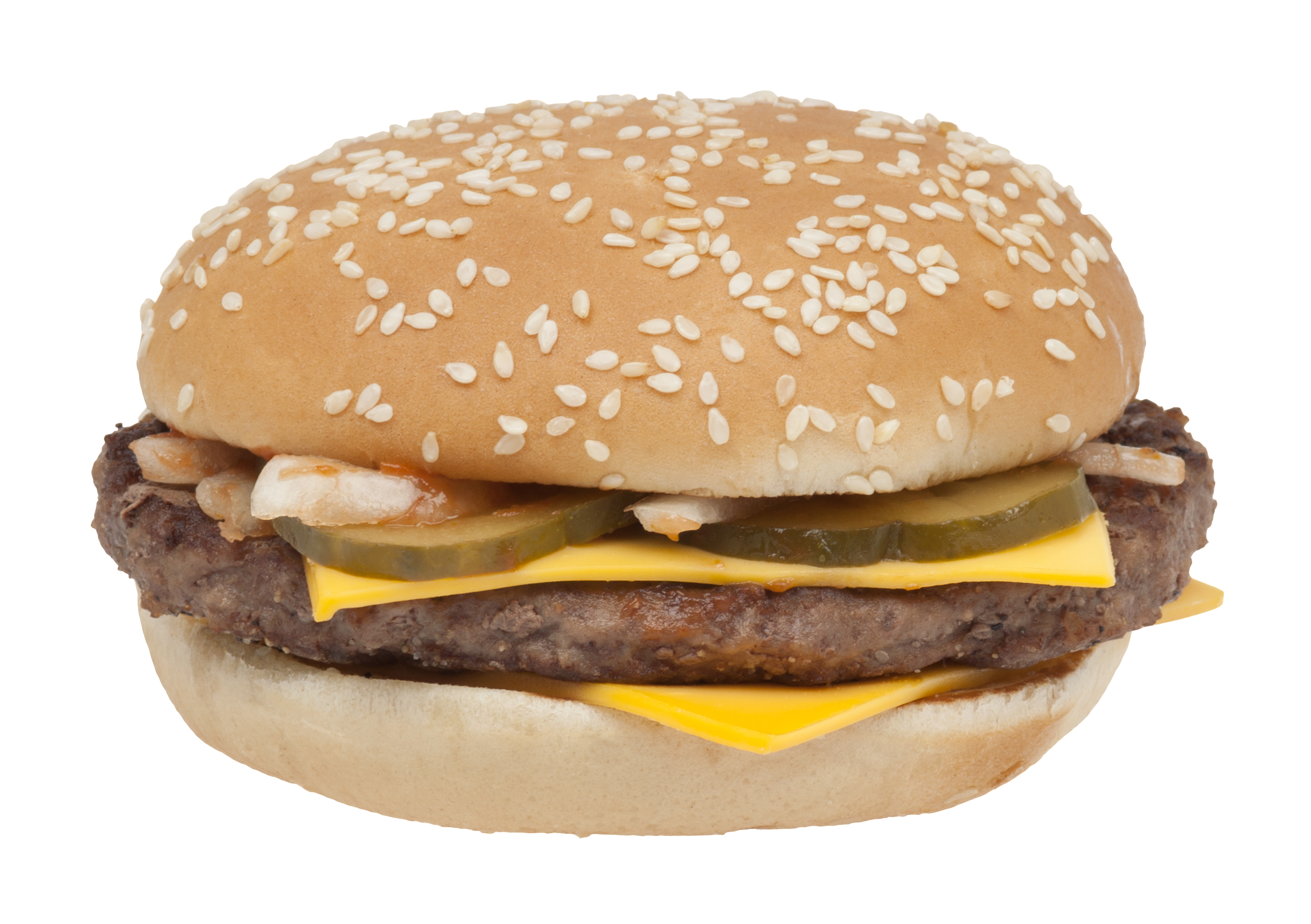
The Quarter Pounder, which was invented by Bernardin in 1971

Bernardin purchased two company-owned McDonald's in Fremont, California, and relocated to the city in 1970. He successfully expanded his McDonald's franchise business, eventually owning nine of the restaurants throughout southern Alameda County.

Once in Fremont, Bernardin began experimenting with new menu items for his franchises. In 1971, Bernardin introduced the now famous Quarter Pounder at his McDonald's locations. He explained his idea for the Quarter Pounder in a 1991 interview marking the 20th anniversary of the burger's development saying, "felt there was a void in our menu vis-à-vis the adult who wanted a higher ratio of meat to bun." Bernardin unveiled the Quarter Pounder using the slogan, "Today Fremont, tomorrow the world." The Quarter Pounder is now one of McDonald's most popular signature items, having been added to the national American menu in 1973.

=== Other McDonald's contributions ===
Additionally, Bernardin worked as McDonald's vice president of product development during his career with the company. Though he was most famous for introducing the Quarter Pounder, Bernardin felt that his most important contribution to McDonald's and the larger fast food industry was the development of frozen french fries. Until 1967, all McDonald's french fries had to be cut on-site from stored potatoes and fried. Bernardin's frozen fries allowed for easier transport of the product and cleared storage space which was previously used for storing potatoes. He explained the benefits of frozen fries saying, "Before that, the (restaurants) had to store potatoes in the basement. It was a real pain."

As vice president, Bernardin also shepherded the development of the McDonald's Filet-O-Fish, as well the company's fried apple and cherry pies. Not all of Bernadin's suggestions were included on McDonald's menus. McDonald's turned down his idea for a ground turkey meat burger called the McGobbler. The company also dismissed his The Lite Mac sandwich, which would have consisted of a one fifth-pound burger patty containing 15% less beef fat than a normal Big Mac.

Bernardin spent approximately two years developing a prototype for buttered corn-on-the-cob, according to his son, Mark Bernardin, who is also a McDonald's franchise owner.

=== Later life ===
Bernardin and his wife, Joan Bernardin, became involved in philanthropy after his uncle received treatment in a hospice. Impressed by his uncle's hospice care, Bernardin founded the Tree of Angels, a Christmas tree lighting festival designed to raise money for the Pathways Hospice, based in Sunnyvale, California.

The couple moved to the Monterey, California, area in the mid-1990s, eventually settling in Pebble Beach. He spent time as a volunteer at hospices throughout northern California. Bernardin became a major benefactor for the Community Hospital of the Monterey Peninsula, known as CHOMP.

In addition to his home in Pebble Beach, Bernardin also had residences in Pleasanton, California, Spanish Bay and Cape Cod.

Bernardin suffered from a stroke later in his life. He died of complications of that stroke on December 22, 2009, at Community Hospital of the Monterey Peninsula in Monterey, California, at the age of 81. He was survived by his wife, Joan Bernardin, two children, Kirsten and Mark, three stepchildren, Dan Ryan, Julie Bullas, Kristie Ryan and ten grandchildren.
