= Arlington County Fire Department =

Fire department of Arlington, US

Coordinates: 38°53′5.5″N 77°5′45″W

Operational area
- Country: United States
- State: Virginia
- County: Arlington

Agency overview
- Established: 1940
- Employees: 390 (uniformed & civilian)
- Staffing: Career
- Fire chief: David Povlitz
- EMS level: BLS and ALS
- IAFF: 2800

Facilities and equipment
- Battalions: 2
- Stations: 9
- Engines: 9
- Trucks: 2
- Platforms: 1
- Rescues: 2
- Ambulances: 9
- HAZMAT: 1

Website
- Official website
- IAFF website

The Arlington County Fire Department (ACFD) provides fire, emergency medical, and allied public safety services for Arlington County and the City of Falls Church in Virginia, USA. It hired the first female career firefighter in the world in 1974 and partnered with the United States Public Health Service to develop America's first Metropolitan Medical Strike Team to respond to the consequences of a chemical, biological or radiological terrorist attack.

The ACFD operates nine stations and is a signatory to an automatic regional response plan with neighboring Fairfax County as well as the city of Alexandria, and participates in a regional mutual aid pact with the District of Columbia and the Maryland counties of Montgomery and Prince George’s. Ronald Reagan Washington National Airport, also in Arlington County, fields a fire department as part of the Metropolitan Washington Airports Authority Fire and Rescue Department and works closely with the county's fire service. The 300-plus employees of the Fire Department provide services through a combination of education, prevention and effective response to fire, medical and environmental emergencies.

The Arlington County Fire Department holds a Class 2 Rating from the Insurance Services Organization, the second-highest rating given to a Virginia fire department, and one of only three such ratings awarded in the state. This rating helps the local community by bringing lower insurance rates to homeowners and businesses.

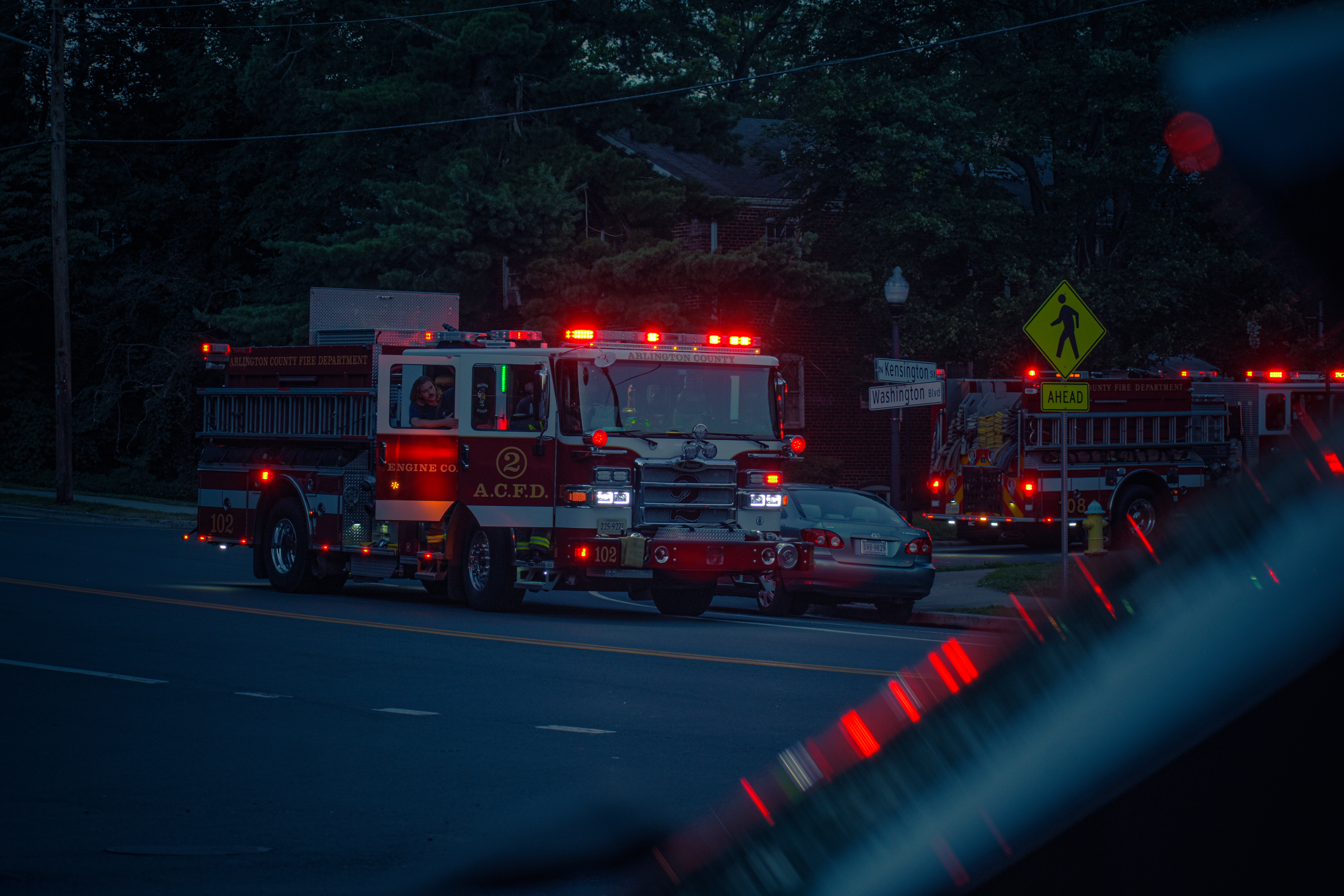
Arlington's Engine 102 responding to a call in Westover. (2024)

== Staffing ==
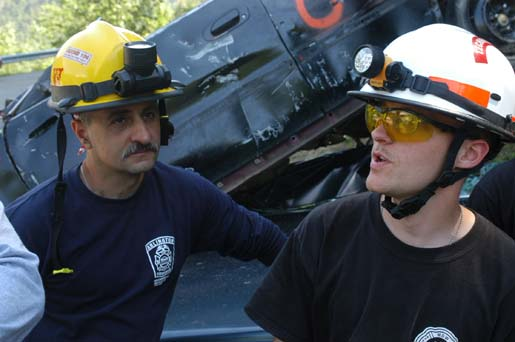
Arlington County firefighters often train with the 911th Engineer Company, a division of the United States Army.

Arlington County Fire Department is a career fire department, with over 380 sworn career Fire personnel and numerous support employees. All units are staffed 24 hours a day by career firefighter/EMTs who are divided into three platoons. Engine Companies, Rescue Companies and Truck Companies/Tower companies in Arlington are typically staffed by three firefighter/EMTs and one firefighter/paramedic, and ALS transport units are staffed with one firefighter/EMT and one firefighter/paramedic. Arlington operates nine engine companies, three truck companies, two rescue companies and eight medic units. Additional medic units can be placed in service as necessary. The county is divided into two divisions, the North Division (102) and the South Division (101), both of which are staffed with one Battalion Chief with Aide, an Advanced Paramedic Officer, an Assistant Fire Marshal and Deputy Fire Marshals.

== Standard Units and Station Assignments ==
Station	Location	Battalion	Engine Company	Truck Company	Rescue Company	EMS Units	Command Staff Units	EMS Supervisor Units	Duty Fire Marshal Units	Specialty Units
1	Glebe Road	Battalion 1	PE101	-	R101	A101	BC101	-	-	HM101
2	Ballston	Battalion 1	PE102	-		M102	-	EM102	-	CU100
3	Cherrydale	Battalion 2	PE103	-	-	-	BC102	-	-	BU100 BU101
4	Clarendon	Battalion 2	PE104	TW104	-	M104 A104	-	-	-	
5	National Landing	Battalion 1	PE105	T105	-	M105	-	-	FM115	WR105
6	Falls Church	Battalion 2	PE106	T106	-	A106	-	-	FM116	-
8	Hall's Hill	Battalion 2	PE108	-	-	A108	-	-	-	LA108, Rehab
9	Nauck	Battalion 1	PE109	-	-	M109	-	EM101	-	-
10	Rosslyn	Battalion 2	PE110	-	-	A110	-	-	FM110	
N/A	Logistics	-	-	-	-	-	-	-	-	Bikes UTs UTVs MCSU100 MAB100 CU 102

Notes:

- Fire Station 7 was permanently closed, effective October 9, 2019.
- The Bravo "B" identifier is used whenever there are two of the same unit operating out of the station. For instance, if both "Medic 104" and "Medic 104 Bravo" are in service
- The Echo "E" identifier is used whenever volunteers have placed an ambulance in service. For instance, "Ambulance 106 Echo".
- "Logistics" refers to un-staffed units not kept at fire stations, but available for use if needed

CAD Identifier	Unit Name	Description
A	Ambulance	Basic Life Support transport unit
BC	Battalion	Battalion Chief SUV with a Command Aide
BT	Boat	
BU	Bomb Unit	
CU	Command Unit	RV-style unit with communication and incident command capabilities
EM	EMS	EMS Supervisor SUV
FM	Fire Marshal	
HM	HazMat	HazMat tractor trailer
M	Medic	Advanced Life Support transport unit
MA	Mobile Air	
MAB	Medical Ambulance Bus	Used for transporting multiple patients
MCSU	Medical Care Support Unit	Carries MCI medical supplies for MAB
PE	Medic Engine	Advanced Life Support pumper
R	Rescue	Heavy Rescue
Rehab	Rehab Unit	A repurposed ambulance used for rehab on fire scenes
T	Truck	Rear mounted ladder truck
TR	Technical Rescue	Technical Rescue tractor trailer
TW	Tower	Rear-mounted tower ladder truck
UT	Utility	Pickup, usually with 4-wheel drive to carry tools, personal or to tow vehicles
UTV	UTV	Smaller, off-road vehicle used for transporting patients at large gatherings, festivals, races, etc.
WR	Water Rescue	

== Other fire departments in the Arlington County System ==
Arlington County Fire Department is the primary all-hazards response agency for Arlington County, Virginia. In addition to ACFD, other fire departments operate and provide emergency and support services to Arlington County.

Station	Location	Staffing	Department	Units Operated
3	Cherrydale	Volunteer	Cherrydale Volunteer Fire Department	LA103, UT103
301	DC Airport (DCA)	Career	Metropolitan Washington Airport Authority	E301, F310, M301, B301
6	Falls Church	Volunteer	Falls Church Volunteer Fire Department	A106E, UT106, E106B
161	Joint Base Myer–Henderson Hall	Career	Fort Myer Fire & Emergency Services	E161, E161B, B161, UT161
162	The Pentagon	Career	Fort Myer Fire & Emergency Services	F161

Prior to 1950, independent volunteer fire companies protected Arlington County. As the demand for services for fire and EMS grew, the need for full-time paid staff was acknowledged by the County. Staff was hired, first to augment the volunteers, then finally to provide the full range of services required in a modern, urban, fire department. The volunteer members ride as supplemental staffing on apparatus and do not count as minimum staffing. The Arlington County Fire Department uses the volunteer apparatus for staffing during peak call volume times and for providing support services, such as special event stand-bys, storm and natural disaster staffing, and scene lighting, air replenishment and canteen services for long duration incidents.

== Bomb squad ==
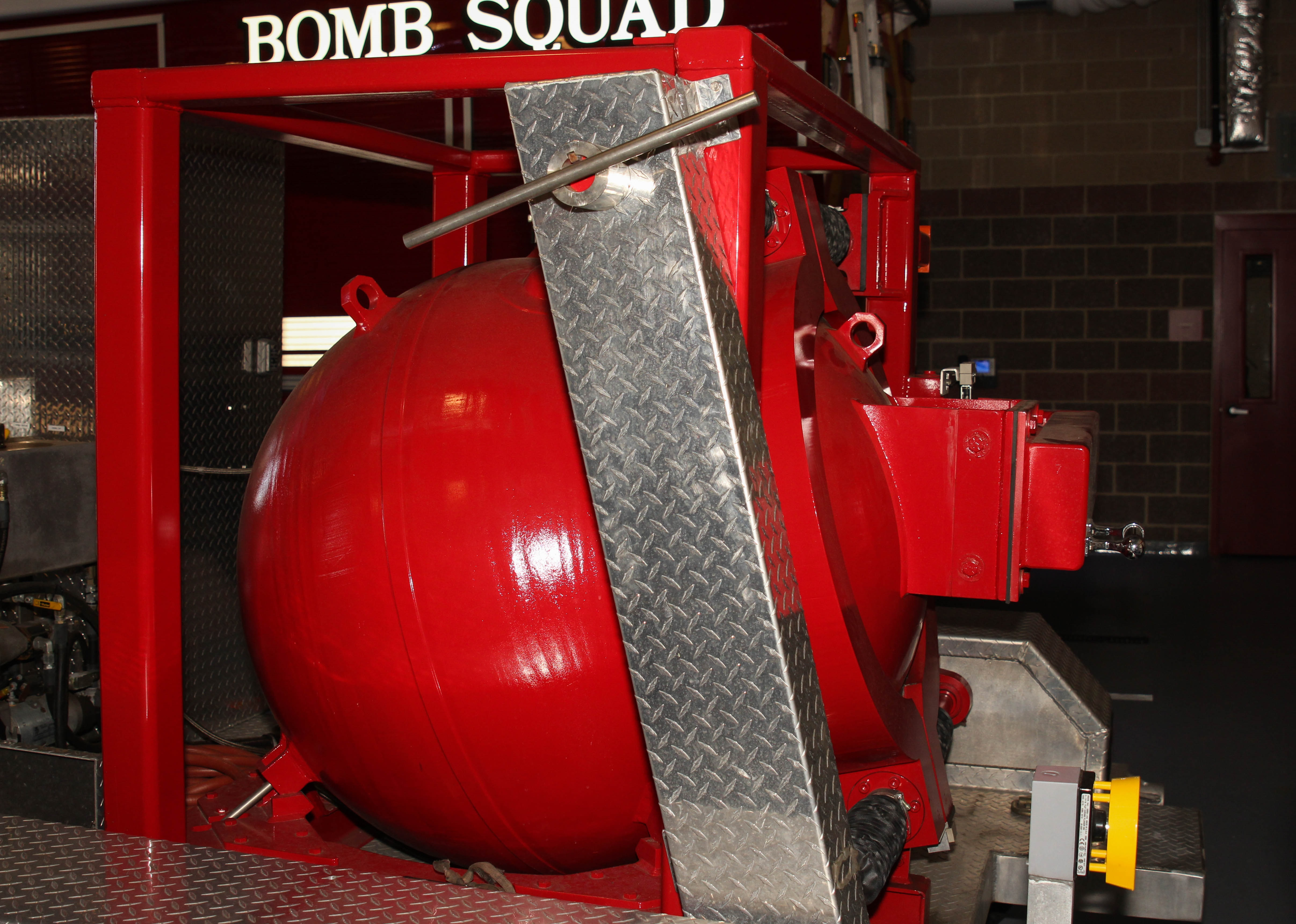
The ACFD Bomb containment chamber.

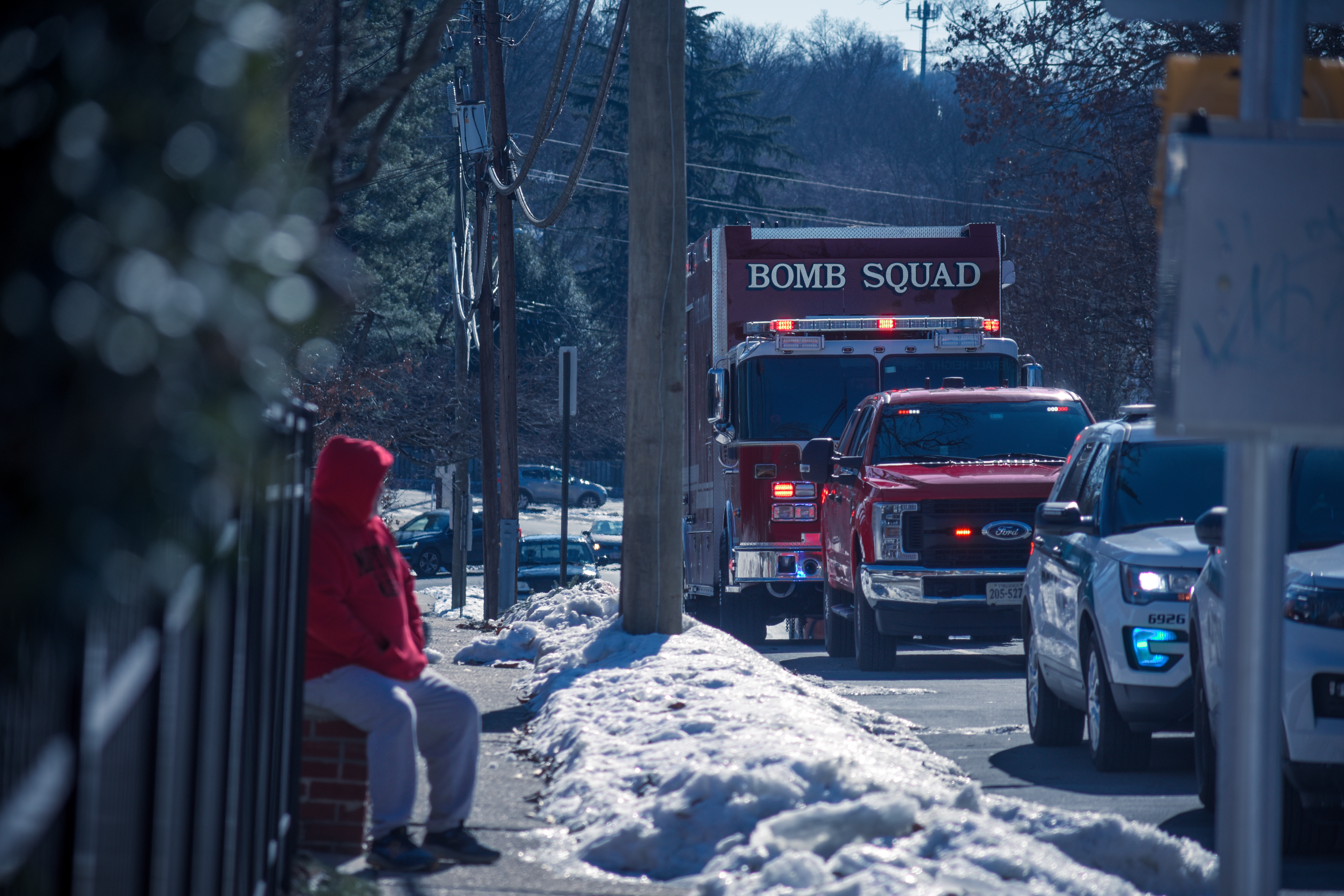
ACFD bomb unit command vehicle responding near Tuckahoe Elementary (2025).

The Arlington County bomb squad is jointly operated by the ACFD and the Arlington County Police Department. While the bomb disposal rigs are staffed by the fire department, and stored at Fire Station 3, the Bomb Squad works with the ACPD explosive canine teams on explosive related incidents. The squad is classified as a Type 2 squad in the FEMA classification system,. meaning the bomb squad has the following equipment available:

- 2 or more response teams
- Full coverage bomb suits
- Portable x-ray devices
- Employ explosive tools to conduct specific or general disruption
- Demolition Kit
- PPE for chemical and biological devices
- A Bomb disposal robot capable of handling non-vehicle IEDs
- Explosives reference library

== September 11^{th} and the Pentagon ==
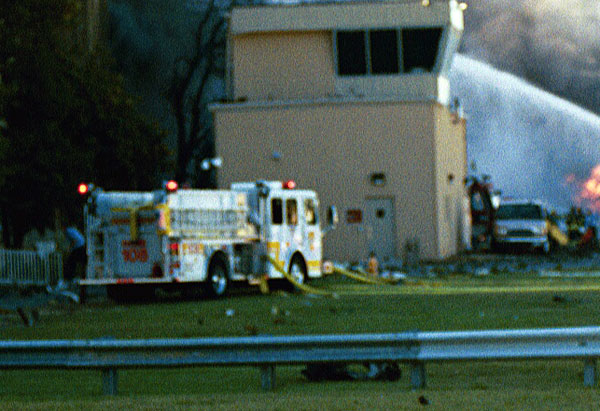
Arlington Engine 105 is seen here operating at the Pentagon shortly after the crash of Flight 77.

The Arlington County Fire Department was the lead agency in the response to the Pentagon attack. ACFD Assistant Chief James Schwartz implemented an incident command system (ICS) to coordinate response efforts among multiple agencies. It took about an hour for the ICS structure to become fully operational. Firefighters from Fort Myer and Reagan National Airport arrived within minutes.

As a result of the attack on the Pentagon, additional career firefighters were hired, bringing the total to 305 by 2005. Minimum staffing on the county's engine companies was also increased to four firefighters from three in the months after the attack. The county trained CERT Teams - Community Emergency Response Teams - in cooperation with the federal Department of Homeland Security as a part of its stepped-up disaster preparedness program.

== Gallery ==
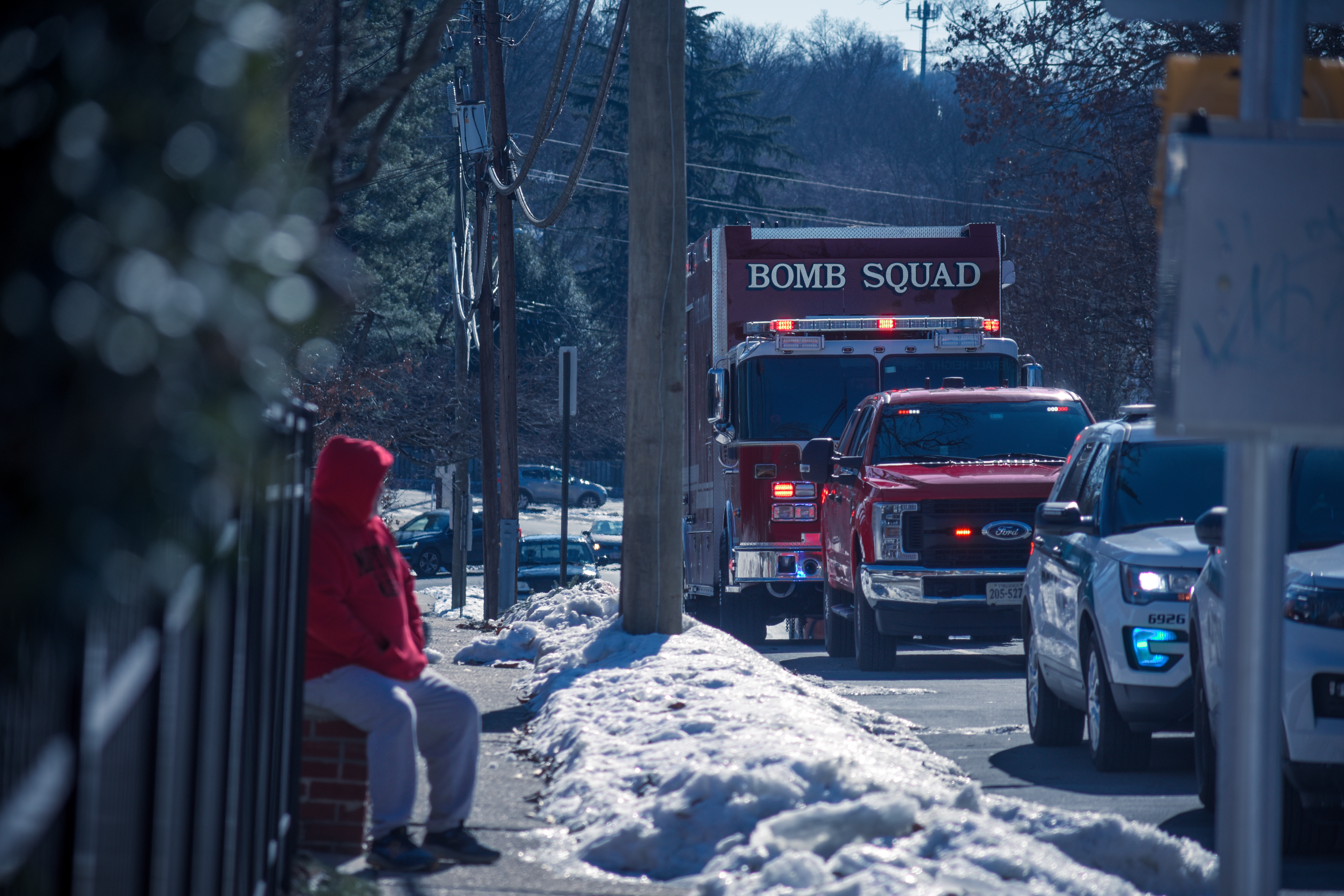
Bomb squad command vehicle. (2025)

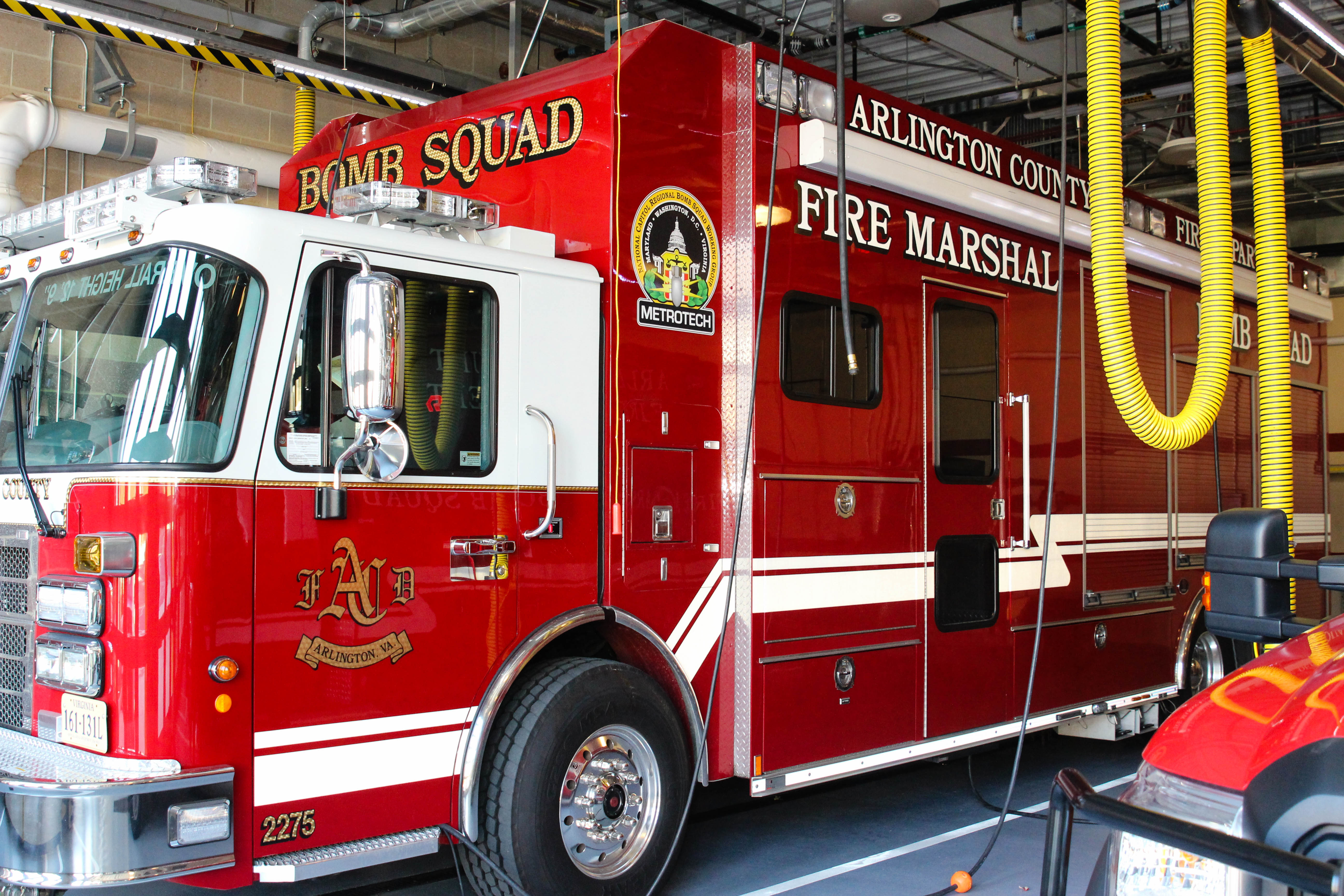
Bomb squad command vehicle. (2014)

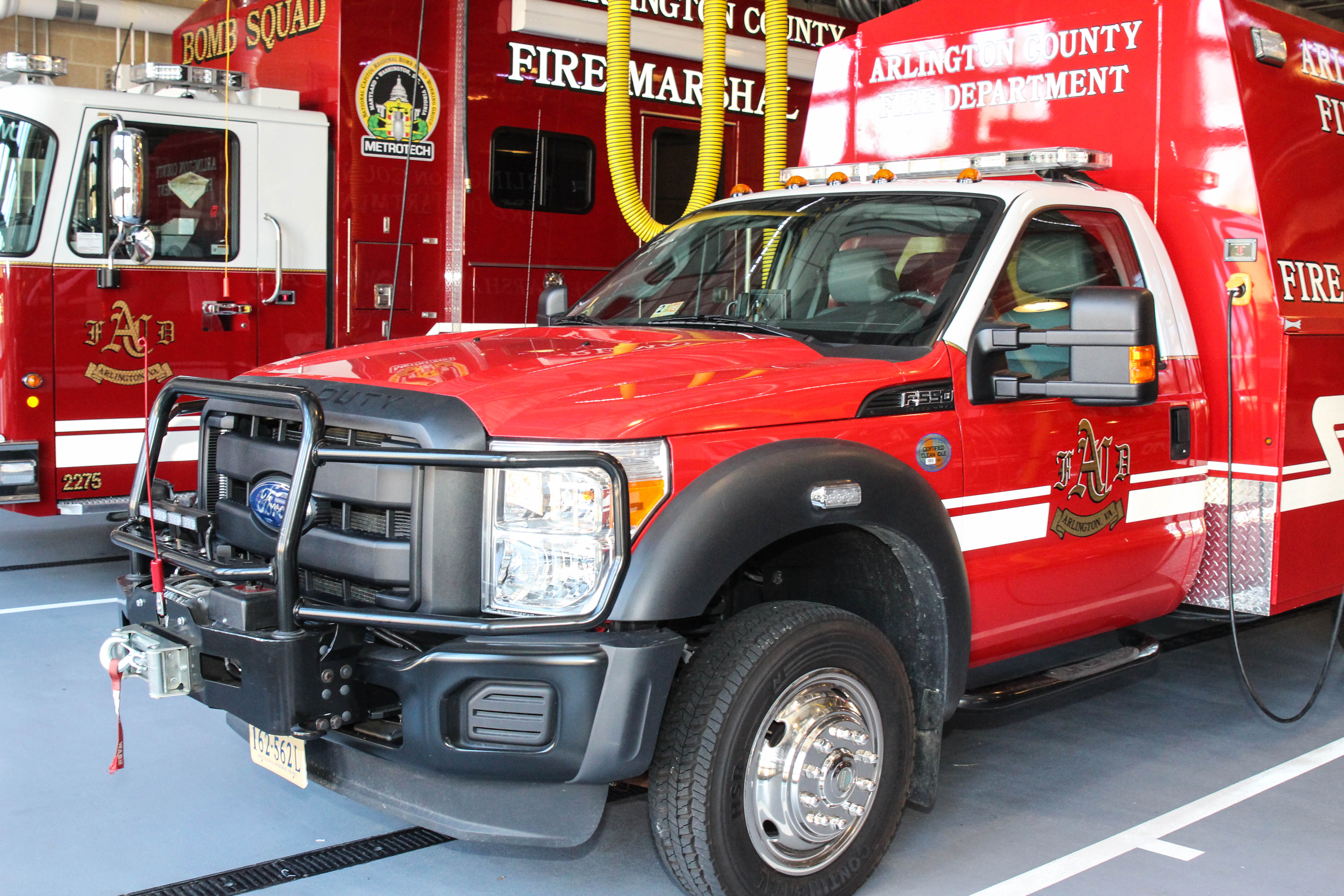
Bomb disposal truck.

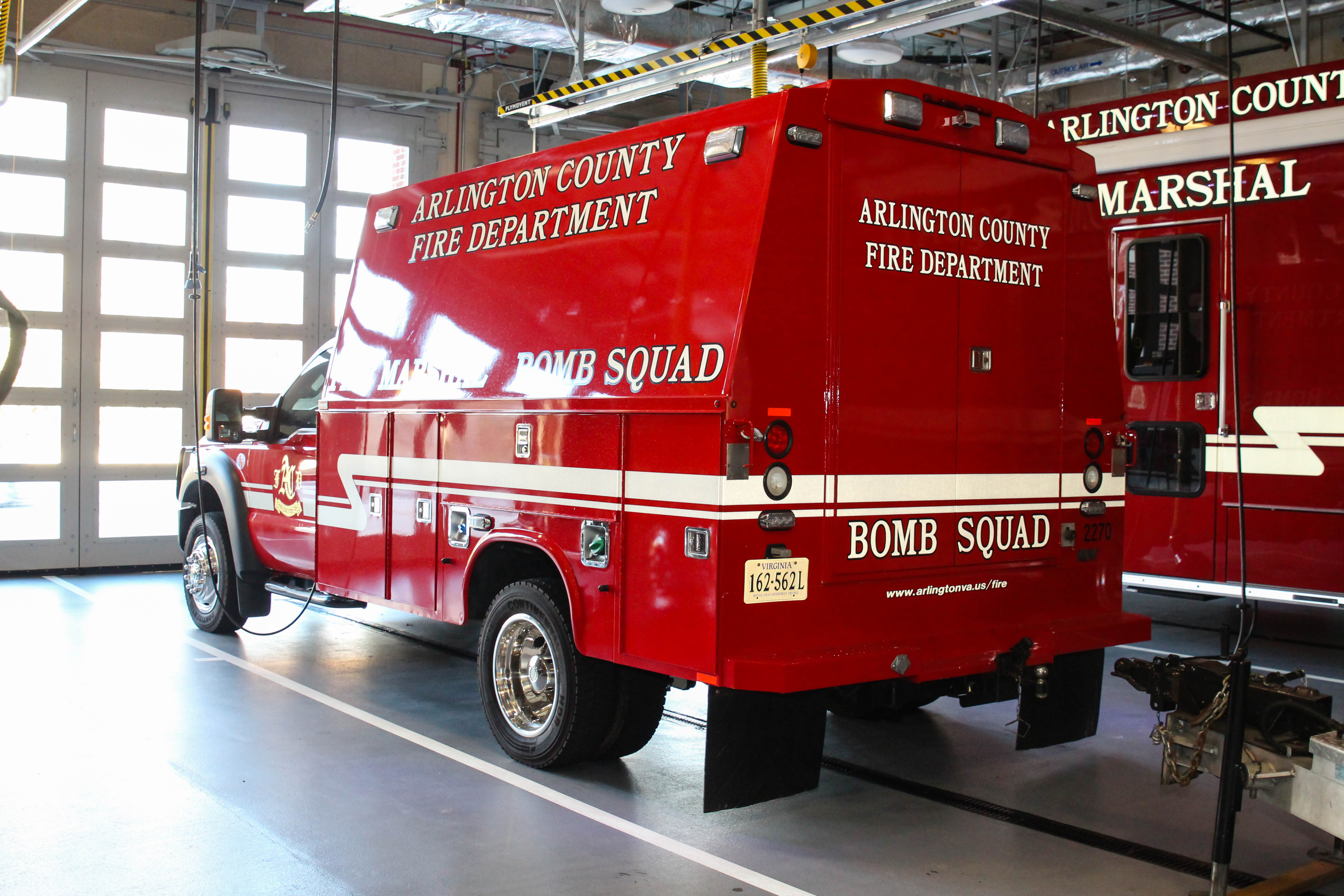
Bomb disposal truck.

== See also ==
- Arlington County, Virginia
- American Airlines Flight 77
- 911th Engineer Company - Formerly the Military District of Washington Engineer Company, specializes in urban search and rescue and responded to the Pentagon following the attack on the Pentagon.
- Judith Livers Brewer, first female career firefighter in the United States
