= 2024 McDonald's E. coli outbreak =

Fast food disease outbreak

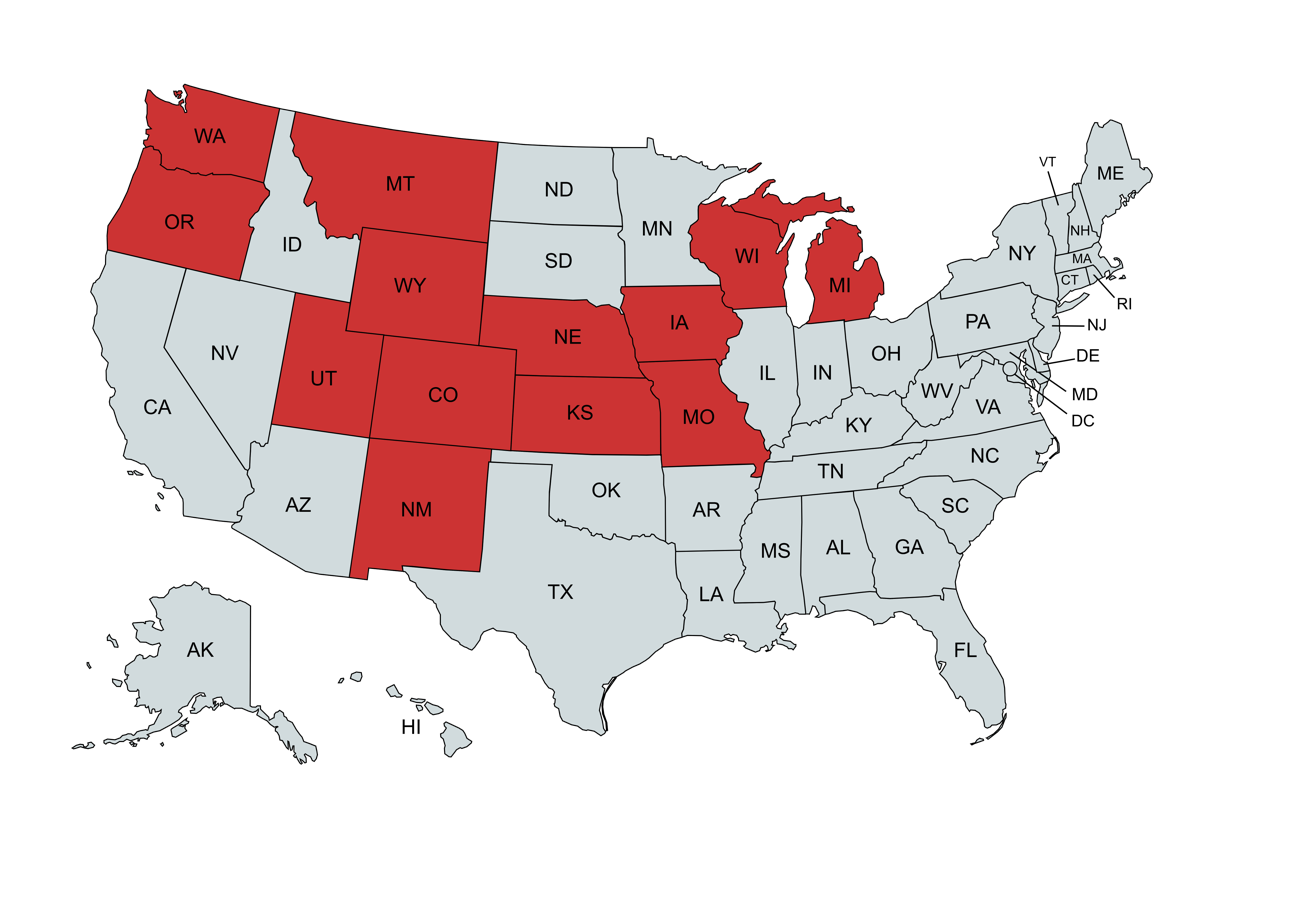
- U.S. states affected by outbreak
- Pathogen: Escherichia coli O157:H7
- Source: Slivered onions used on Quarter Pounders at McDonald's restaurants
- Location: United States
- First reported: October 22, 2024
- Date: September 12 – October 21, 2024
- Confirmed cases: 104
- Hospitalized cases: 34
- Deaths: 1

An E. coli outbreak involving contaminated slivered onions on Quarter Pounders sold at McDonald's stores in 14 U.S. states occurred from September to October 2024. At least 104 people contracted Escherichia coli, and one person died.

== Outbreak ==
The Food and Drug Administration (FDA) issued a public warning through its Coordinated Outbreak Response & Evaluation Network (CORE Network) about the E. coli outbreak on October 22. Their initial investigation noted 49 cases of E. coli throughout 10 U.S. states (Colorado, Kansas, Utah, Wyoming, and portions of Idaho, Iowa, Missouri, Montana, Nebraska, New Mexico, and Oklahoma). The Centers for Disease Control and Prevention (CDC) at the time did not confirm the origin, but the government agency suspected it was either slivered onions or beef patties. An update to the investigation was published on October 25 with 26 new cases, 12 new hospitalizations, and 3 new U.S. states (Oregon, Washington, and Utah).

On October 22, McDonald's stores in the affected states temporarily removed the Quarter Pounder from the menu or stopped serving it with the specific slivered onions and beef patties. The Colorado Department of Agriculture (CDA) laboratories analyzed subsamples from all the lots of McDonald's brand fresh and frozen beef patties collected from various McDonald's locations in Colorado and found them to be negative for E. coli.

A second update on the investigation was published on October 30, stating that epidemiologic and traceback information shows that fresh, slivered onions were the likely source of illness in this outbreak. The Food Safety and Inspection Service (FSIS) performed a traceback of beef patties served on Quarter Pounders at McDonald's, and evidence did not point to ground beef as the likely source of contamination. The Food and Drug Administration is looking into a Washington onion "grower of interest".

A third update was published on November 13, adding 14 new cases, 7 new hospitalizations, and North Carolina to the affected states. The FDA tested recalled onions in which one sample tested positive for non-O157:H7 Shiga toxin-producing E. coli. The E. coli found was not the outbreak strain. A fourth and final update was published on December 3, with no additional cases. The CDC declared the outbreak over.

== Infection ==
Escherichia coli O157:H7 is a serotype of the bacterial species Escherichia coli and is one of the Shiga-like toxin–producing types of E. coli. It is a cause of disease, typically foodborne illness, through consumption of contaminated and raw food, including raw milk and undercooked ground beef.

== Responses ==
On October 25, Taylor Farms, the supplier of the slivered onions to the affected stores, initiated a voluntary recall on yellow onions. While there were growers of interest that supplied Taylor Farms, FDA has not been able to implicate the specific grower.

On December 3, 2024, the CDC declared the outbreak was "over," and the FDA announced they had closed their investigation.

The outbreak prompted several lawsuits against both McDonald's and the onion supplier, Taylor Fresh Foods. On October 23, 2024, a man who fell ill after eating a sandwich at a McDonald's location in Greeley, Colorado, filed one of the first lawsuits related to the incident. Later that month, a man filed a proposed class action lawsuit in the U.S. District Court for the Northern District of Illinois against McDonald's, alleging that the fast-food chain failed to disclose the risk of E. coli contamination leading to the illnesses. In November 2024, a lawsuit seeking class action status was filed in the U.S. District Court for the Northern District of California against Taylor Fresh Foods, alleging that the company failed to warn consumers of an E. coli risk.

== See also ==
- 1992–1993 Jack in the Box E. coli outbreak
- 1996 Odwalla E. coli outbreak
