= Metropolitan Washington Airports Authority =

Airport authority in Washington D.C.

- Abbreviation: MWAA
- Formation: June 7, 1987; 39 years ago
- Type: Airport authority
- Headquarters: Crystal City, Arlington County, Virginia, U.S.
- Region served: Washington metropolitan area
- President and CEO: John E. Potter
- Affiliations: Operator of: Dulles International Airport; Ronald Reagan Washington National Airport; Dulles Toll Road; Constructor of the: Metro Silver Line
- Staff: 1,300+
- Website: mwaa.com

The Metropolitan Washington Airports Authority (MWAA) is an independent airport authority, created by the Commonwealth of Virginia and the District of Columbia, with the consent of the United States Congress, to oversee management, operations, and capital development of the two major airports serving the U.S. national capital: Ronald Reagan Washington National Airport and Dulles International Airport.

The Airports Authority was established to operate as a financially self-sustaining entity with the mission to manage and enhance Washington, D.C.'s two-airport system. The authority leases the airports from the United States Department of Transportation. The U.S. government originally built the airports and continues to own the underlying airport property except for property acquired by MWAA subsequent to the lease.

== Operations ==
The daily operation of the airports, their central administration, their police and fire departments and their payroll are not funded by tax dollars. Operating costs are paid through aircraft landing fees, rents for use of terminals and other facilities and revenues from concessions and parking. The Airports Authority is responsible for capital improvements at the airports, which are funded in part by passenger facility charges collected through airline tickets, Federal Airport Improvement Program funds and the proceeds of bonds issued by the Airports Authority.

In 2008, the Airports Authority’s responsibilities were expanded to include the operation of the Dulles Toll Road and management of the construction project to extend the metropolitan Washington region's Metrorail mass transit system for 23 miles (37.01 kilometres) from the existing East Falls Church station in Virginia to Dulles International Airport and beyond into Loudoun County, Virginia.

Tolls collected on the Dulles Toll Road are used to operate and improve the Toll Road and fund a portion of the construction of the Metrorail extension project. Additional funding for the Metrorail project is supplied by federal grants and loans and by contributions from the Commonwealth of Virginia, and Loudoun and Fairfax counties in the commonwealth.

The authority's headquarters is located less than 1 mile (1.609 km) from Reagan National Airport in the Crystal City neighborhood of Arlington County, Virginia. A third major airport in the Washington region, Baltimore/Washington International Airport (BWI) is located 9 miles (14.48 km) south of downtown Baltimore. BWI Airport is not operated by MWAA, but is owned by the state of Maryland, and operated through the Maryland Aviation Administration, which purchased the then-named "Friendship Airport" from the city of Baltimore in 1972.

== History ==
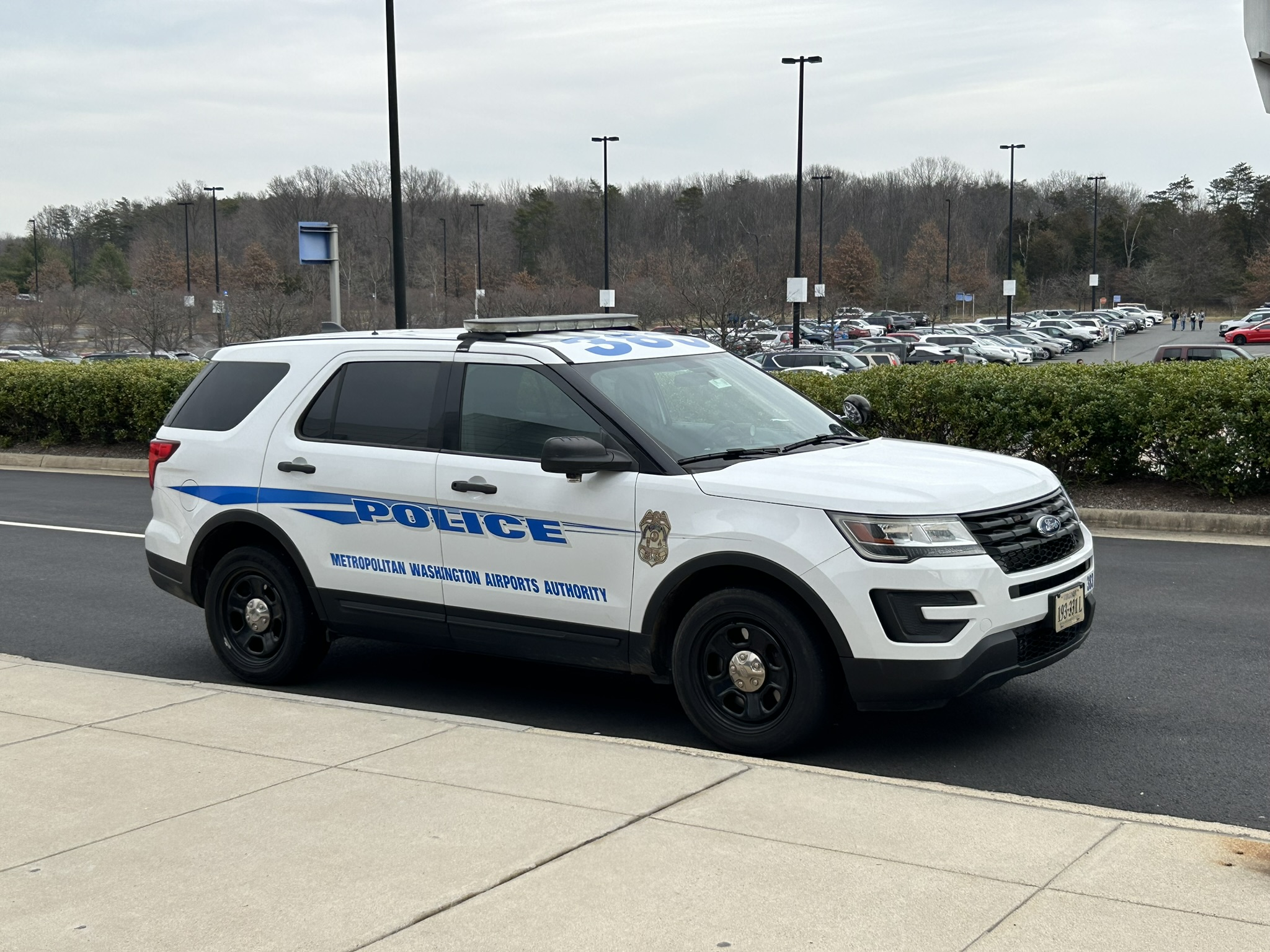
A Ford Police Interceptor Utility of the MWAA at the Steven F. Udvar-Hazy Center in Chantilly, Virginia

The authority was created by the Commonwealth of Virginia (1985 Acts of Assembly, Ch 598, as amended) and the District of Columbia (Regional Airports Authority Act of 1985, as amended). On June 7, 1987, Dulles International Airport and Ronald Reagan Washington National Airport (then known as Washington National Airport) were transferred to MWAA under a 50‑year lease authorized by the U.S. Congress in the Metropolitan Washington Airports Act of 1986, Title VI of Public Law 99‑500, which was signed into law by President Ronald Reagan. Prior to the transfer, the airports were owned and operated by the federal government through the Federal Aviation Administration in the United States Department of Transportation. Under the transfer act, all property owned by the FAA at the airports was transferred to the new Authority, with the Federal government retaining title to the lease. The original 50‑year lease has been extended to 80 years, expiring in June 2067.

On February 6, 1998, President Bill Clinton signed into law an act passed by Congress which officially changed the name of Washington National Airport to Ronald Reagan Washington National Airport.

== Governance ==
The authority is governed by a 17-member board of directors with seven members appointed by the governor of Virginia, four by the mayor of the District of Columbia, three by the governor of Maryland, and three by the president of the United States. Leading the management of the authority is president and chief executive officer, John E. Potter. Potter's tenure began on July 18, 2011 after a nationwide search was conducted for a permanent president and CEO. Three people served as CEO prior to Potter: James Wilding, James Bennett and Lynn Hampton. Each airport operated by MWAA is under the direction of a vice president and airport manager.

=== Board members appointed by the president ===
As with the other members of the board, these are appointed for six year terms, renewable once, are not allowed to serve past the expiration of their terms, may not hold elective or appointive political office, and serves without compensation except for reasonable expenses incident to board functions. The members of the board appointed by the president must be registered voters other states than Maryland, Virginia, or the District of Columbia. No more than two of these three members may be of the same political party. In carrying out their duties on the board, members appointed by the president shall ensure that adequate consideration is given to the national interest. They may be removed by the president for cause.

==== Current board members appointed by the president ====
The current members of the MWAA board appointed by the president as of May 18, 2026:

Name	State	Party	Took office	Term expires
Trent Morse	Florida	Republican	January 21, 2026	May 30, 2030
Vacant				May 30, 2028
Vacant				November 22, 2029

== Airport highways: the Dulles Access and Toll roads ==
MWAA's lease encompasses the Dulles Access Road's right-of-way. The Dulles Airport Access Road serves traffic to and from Dulles Airport only. Since 2008, MWAA has had ownership of the Dulles Toll Road, the outer lanes of the right-of-way which were built by the Virginia Department of Transportation, and the usage of which is subject to a toll. However, the inner lanes, which comprise the aforementioned Dulles Access Road, are free of charge for drivers going directly between Dulles Airport and the surrounding area.

== Dulles Corridor Metrorail Silver Line Project ==
MWAA constructed a Silver Line extension of the D.C. Metrorail system, which completed the long-awaited rail link between downtown Washington, Tysons, Reston, Dulles Airport, and eastern Loudoun County. Phase 1, which was completed in 2014, extended the Metrorail system to Reston, Virginia. Phase 2 included the construction of the rail infrastructure, stations, pedestrian bridges to the stations, systems, and entrance pavilions, as well as the aerial tracks at Dulles Airport. A rail and maintenance yard on 90 acres (36.42 hectares) of airport-owned property was also built to serve the needs of the entire Metro system. The project was completed in November 2022.

== Police and fire ==
The Metropolitan Washington Airports Authority has its own, full-service, state (Virginia) accredited police department which patrols airport properties and grounds, including the Dulles Airport Access Highway, the Dulles Toll Road and the area 300 yards surrounding the airports. The Virginia State Police, Fairfax County Police, and Loudoun County Sheriff's also exercise police power over the airport property within their respective jurisdiction including the Dulles Airport Access Highway and the Dulles Toll Road. Virginia law also grants concurrent jurisdiction to the Arlington County Police for Reagan National Airport.

The authority also has a full-service Fire and Rescue Department that operates at both Dulles and National Airports. The authority's Fire and Rescue Department provides a wide range of services to the airports including aircraft rescue firefighting in accordance with the standards of the Federal Aviation Administration, structural firefighting, emergency medical services (basic and advanced life support) and river rescue (at National Airport). The authority's Fire & Rescue Department will also provide mutual-aid services to the surrounding jurisdictions, as needed, under a Memorandum of Understanding signed by several jurisdictions in Northern Virginia. As an example, firefighters from National Airport were among the first responders to the Pentagon following the crash of American Airlines Flight 77 during the September 11 attacks.
