= Quarter Pounder =

Hamburger sold by McDonald's

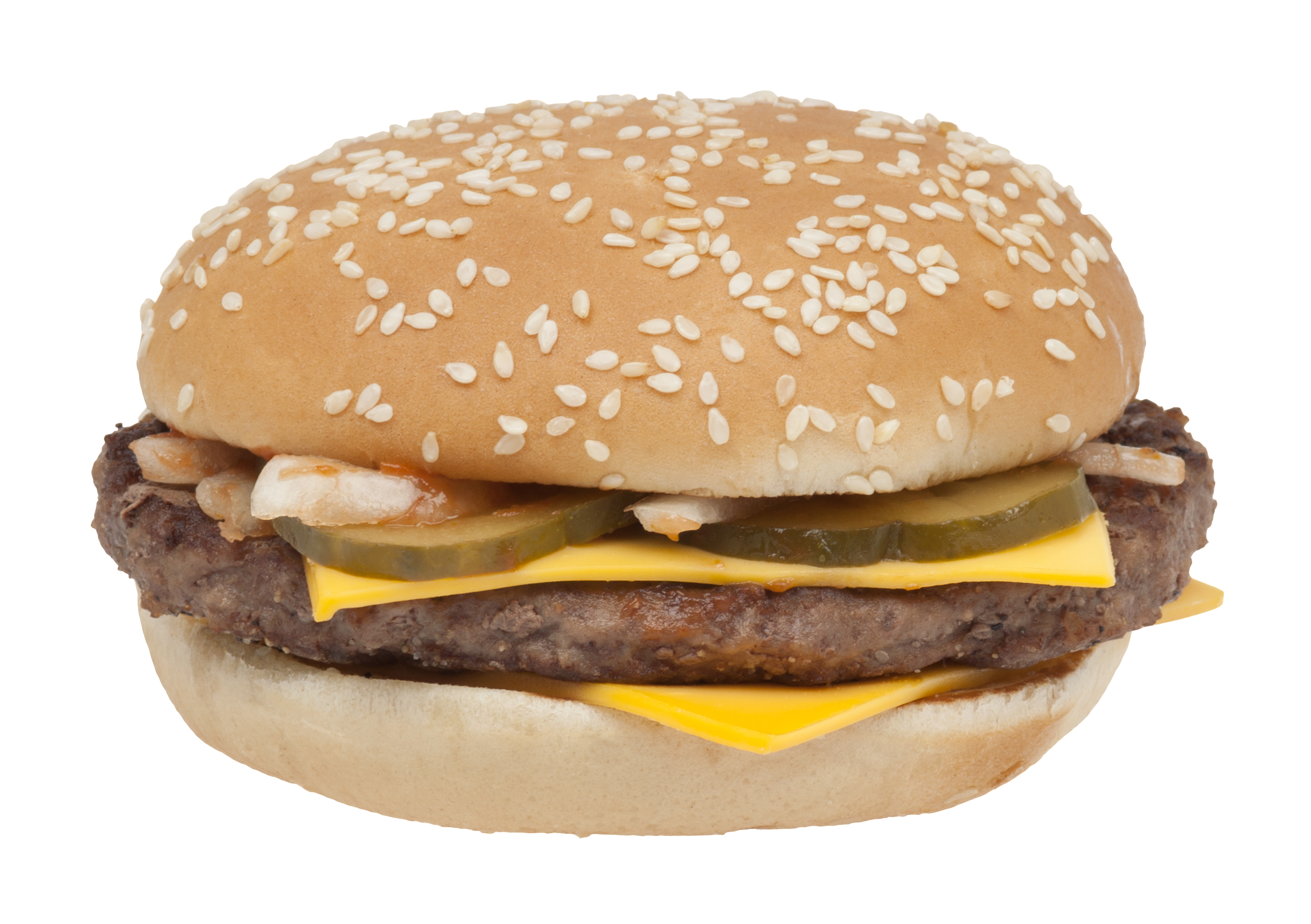
- A Quarter Pounder with cheese

Nutritional value per 1 burger (220 g)
- Energy: 520 kcal (2,200 kJ)
- Carbohydrates: 39 g (13%)
- Sugars: 10 g
- Dietary fiber: 2 g (10%)
- Fat: 28 g (43%)
- Saturated: 13 g (66%)
- Trans: 1.5 g
- Protein: 31 g
Vitamins and minerals
Vitamins	Quantity %DV^{†}
Vitamin A	1090 IU
Vitamin C	2% 2 mg
Minerals	Quantity %DV^{†}
Calcium	15% 190 mg
Iron	25% 4.5 mg
Sodium	48% 1100 mg
- Other constituents: Quantity
- Energy w/o cheese: 420 kcal (1,800 kJ)
- Energy from fat: 250 kcal (1,000 kJ)
- Cholesterol: 100 mg (34%)
- May vary outside U.S. market
- ^{†}Percentages estimated using US recommendations for adults. Source: McDonalds

The Quarter Pounder is a brand of hamburger introduced in 1971 by McDonald's and extended nationwide in 1973. Its name refers to the beef patty having a precooked weight of approximately one quarter of a pound, originally portioned as four ounces (113.4 g) but increased to 4.25 oz (120.5 g) in 2015. In some countries where the pound is not customarily used as a unit of weight, the hamburger's branding instead features the word Royal.

In 2013, the Quarter Pounder was expanded to represent a whole line of hamburgers that replaced the company's Angus hamburger, which was discontinued due to high prices for Angus beef at the time.

== History ==
The Quarter Pounder was created by Al Bernardin, a franchise owner and former McDonald's Vice President of product development, in Fremont, California, in 1971. Bernardin had moved to Fremont in 1970 after purchasing two company-owned McDonald's restaurants.

Bernardin began experimenting with new menu items for his McDonald's franchises. In 1971, Bernardin introduced the first Quarter Pounders at his McDonald's in Fremont using the slogan, "Today Fremont, tomorrow the world." The Quarter Pounder became such a success, it was added to the national American menu in 1973. Since May 2018, McDonald's is using fresh beef with no preservatives added for their Quarter Pounders at their continental U.S. locations. On October 1, 2018, McDonald's announced that it would remove all artificial preservatives, flavors, and coloring from the Quarter Pounders.

An E. coli outbreak from September to October 2024 was linked to contaminated slivered onions supplied by Taylor Farms that were used in Quarter Pounders in 14 states. 104 reported cases, and one death, were attributed to the contaminated onions.

=== Japan ===
In November 2008, McDonald's Japan (which until then had never offered the Quarter Pounder as a regular item) converted two Tokyo restaurants into "Quarter Pounder"–branded restaurants which only sold Quarter Pounder meals. These promotional branches closed on November 27, 2008, coinciding with the re-introduction of the Quarter Pounder at regular McDonald's branches throughout the Kantō (Tokyo) region from November 28. The Quarter Pounder was launched at one McDonald's restaurant in the Kansai (Osaka) region on December 23, 2008. It was later reported that 15,000 customers had visited the restaurant on the first day, generating a record 10.02 million yen in sales for a single restaurant in one day. However, it was also revealed that McDonald's had hired 1,000 "extras" to queue up on the first day. McDonald's Japan explained that the hirees were used for "product monitoring purposes".

The Quarter Pounder was discontinued in Japan as of April 4, 2017. McDonald's Holdings Co. has to date given no official reason for the removal. It was replaced by a line of three "Gran" (グラン) burgers around the same date.

== Product description ==
The burger comprises a beef patty weighing 120.5 g (4.25 oz) before cooking and 3 oz (85 g) prepared, pickles, raw onion, ketchup, and mustard. In the United States, Portugal and South Africa there are three variations: the Quarter Pounder with cheese, Quarter Pounder with Cheese & Bacon and the Quarter Pounder Deluxe.

The nutritional content of the Quarter Pounder varies between countries and locations. For example, in Australia, which uses local beef for its McDonald's products, the average Quarter Pounder has 33.7 g of protein per serving, a higher value than that stated for the same burger in the United States.

== Product name ==
In English-speaking countries the product retains the Quarter Pounder name despite metrication; in Quebec, it is known as Quart de livre. The term Quarterão com Queijo is used in metric Brazil, Cuarto de Libra con Queso in Spain and in Hispanic America, Quarter Pounder Cheese is used in Finland, and QP Cheese in Sweden. Some European countries, like Norway and the Netherlands simply refer to it as the Quarter Pounder. In Hong Kong, the Quarter Pounder is known as a "full three taels" (Chinese: 足三両) in Chinese because three taels is exactly equal in weight to a quarter pound, while the English name Quarter Pounder is retained. In Taiwan it is known as the "four-ounce beefburger" (Chinese: 四盎司牛肉堡). The Quarter Pounder is unavailable in mainland China. In Japan, the name was a katakana representation of "Quarter Pounder" (クォーターパウンダー Kwōtā Paundā).

In several countries that do not customarily use the pound as a unit of weight, the Quarter Pounder is sold under different names. In France, Belgium, Croatia and Cyprus it is called the Royal Cheese and includes cheese. In German-speaking Europe it was once labelled Viertelpfünder (literally "quarter pounder") before being rebranded as Hamburger Royal during the 1980s; in Germany it includes lettuce and tomato and is branded Hamburger Royal TS (TS standing for Tomate und Salat, tomato and lettuce). In Russia and Ukraine, it was known as Royal Cheeseburger, and since 2016 in Russia it is called Grand Cheeseburger. In Hungary, Latvia and Poland it is called McRoyal.

In some Middle Eastern countries such as Saudi Arabia and United Arab Emirates, McDonald's offers both a Quarter Pounder and a McRoyale burger, the McRoyale having slightly different ingredients.

=== Other fractional-pound hamburgers ===
A competing chain, A&W, attempted to introduce a similar, but larger burger in the 1980s which contained a one-third pound (151.2 g) beef patty rather than a one-quarter pound (113.4 g) patty, but it met with customer disinterest due to the perception that a patty which was a third of a pound was lighter and smaller than a quarter pound patty. This confusion stems from the fact that the denominator of the fraction 1/3 is smaller than the denominator for 1/4 (i.e., 3 < 4). The restaurant later jocularly introduced the 3/9 Pound Burger anew in 2021 amid Internet folklore relaying the story.

=== Cultural reference ===
In the opening of the 1994 film Pulp Fiction, Vincent Vega points out that the Quarter Pounder’s name wouldn’t make sense in France, where the metric system is used, and explains that the item is called a "Royale with Cheese" (though in reality, the French menu calls it a Royal Cheese).

== See also ==
- List of sandwiches
- Whopper
- Third-pound burger
