= Cherrydale Volunteer Fire House =

Historic fire station in Virginia, United States

Cherrydale Volunteer Fire Department

Agency overview
- Established: 1898
- Employees: 50
- Staffing: Volunteer
- EMS level: BLS
- Cherrydale Volunteer Fire House
- U.S. National Register of Historic Places
- Virginia Landmarks Register
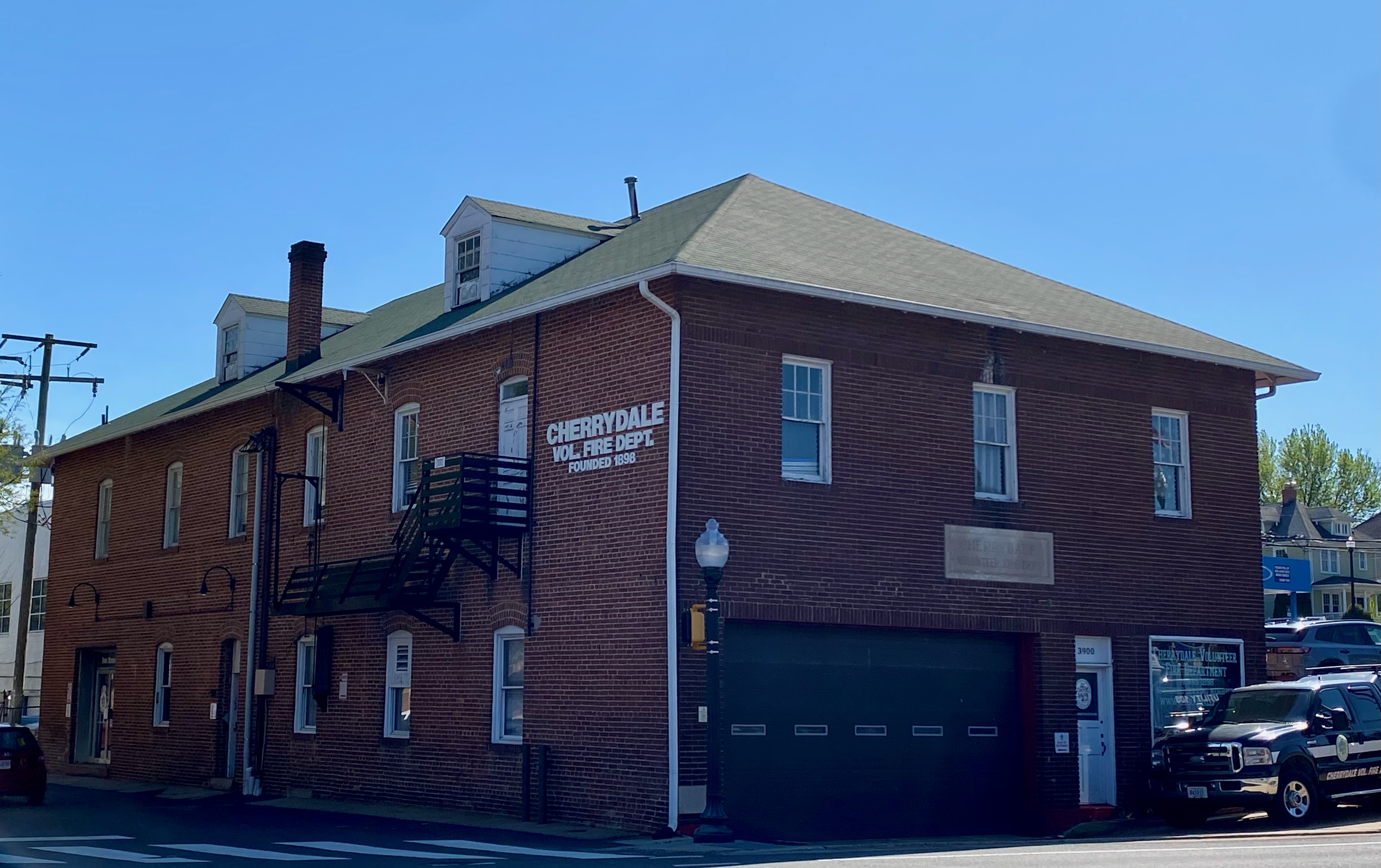
- Fire station building in 2026

- Location within District of Columbia Location within Virginia Location within the United States
- Location: 3900 Langston Blvd, Arlington, Virginia
- Coordinates: 38°53′14″N 77°6′26″W
- Area: less than one acre
- Built: 1919
- Architectural style: Colonial Revival
- NRHP reference No.: 95000927
- VLR No.: 000-0044

Significant dates
- Added to NRHP: July 28, 1995
- Designated VLR: April 28, 1995
- Motto: Our Family Helping Your Family

Facilities and equipment
- Stations: 1
- Engines: 0
- Trucks: 2
- Squads: 0
- Rescues: 0
- Ambulances: 0

The Cherrydale Volunteer Fire House is home to the Cherrydale Volunteer Fire Department in the Cherrydale neighborhood of Arlington, Virginia. Constructed in 1919, it has been a focal point for community attention ever since. The building served as Arlington County Fire Station #3 until a new station opened nearby in July 2011.

== Early history ==
The Cherrydale Volunteer Fire Department was organized in 1898 by a group of twelve men. It is the oldest volunteer fire department in Arlington County. Since its beginnings, the Cherrydale Volunteer Fire Department has remained active in the community, serving in many ways - from fighting fires and saving lives to sponsoring Christmas and Halloween parties, dances, parades, youth sports activities, and Bingo games. During the first few years after the CVFD was organized, the equipment (consisting of leather buckets, bells, and ladders) stayed out in the open. By 1906, a small shed (later referred to as "House #2") on what is now Taylor Street was erected to house the County's first mechanized equipment - a hand-drawn water and hose cart.

"Engine House #1," another small shed with a hose tower atop, was completed on the grounds of the old Cherrydale School in December 1912. It housed the first real fire engine in Arlington, a 60-gallon pumper engine which was purchased by the Cherrydale Volunteers in 1913. In 1914, "Engine House #3" was erected in the Maywood area. "Engine House #4" was completed a few months afterwards. These buildings housed additional firefighting apparatus owned by the Volunteers, including a ladder truck and chemical engine.

In 1915, after years of site searches, the Volunteers purchased a lot for $362 on Lee Highway for a new "Central Station House," the name given to the same station that serves Cherrydale today. The Volunteers used various methods to raise money to purchase the land and begin construction of the new station. One unique method was selling bricks. Prominent citizens were asked to contribute and a brick would be placed in their name. President and Mrs. Woodrow Wilson were among those who purchased bricks for the Cherrydale Station. In the late 1920s and early 1930s, the Volunteers sold the four original engine houses to help pay for the "Central Station House."

On November 10, 1919, the cornerstone was placed with elaborate ceremony. The two most important speakers that day were the Honorable Ralph Walton Moore, State Senator, and Crandal Mackey, who is often called the "Father of the County Fire Department." The new station house was officially dedicated with an elaborate banquet in 1920. In 1923, the stone nameplate was added to the front of the building.

In a brief reminiscence, one Cherrydale resident remembers the station this way: "The Firehouse, as we called it, was just finished when I came to Cherrydale in 1919. A dignified red brick building -- thereafter, it was the center of a part of our lives. We loved listening to the stories told by the firemen -- listening for the telephone as he sat in his chair tilted against the wall near the open door in good weather. The activities there, the good times we had can never be surpassed."

The National Park Service listed the fire house on the National Register of Historic Places on July 28, 1995. The Arlington County Board designated the building to be a local historic district on July 28, 1995.

== Firehouse today ==
Repairs and modifications to the structure have been numerous over the years. The store, to the right of the apparatus bay, has been changed many times since it was rented to a grocer in the late 1920s. A major remodeling took place in 1928 when plumbing fixtures were added followed by the addition of dormers in the 1950s. In 1987, the entire first floor of the station was remodeled for more modern equipment and living arrangements. The upstairs community hall was restored to its original appearance in 1998.

The Cherrydale fire station was staffed solely by volunteers until 1940. As the area grew and call volumes increased, the County augmented the volunteer staffing by hiring a paid firefighter to help staff the station. Until 2011, the Cherrydale fire station was staffed by four Arlington County career firefighters as well as the volunteers. While the career firefighters moved to new Fire Station 3 on Old Dominion Drive, the volunteer company remains at the historic firehouse. The volunteers are trained to respond not only to fires, but also to emergency medical calls, hazardous materials incidents, and other rescue incidents.

The Cherrydale Volunteer Fire Department owns Light and Air 103, which provides lighting, breathing air replenishment services, salvage, and other services to the Arlington County Fire Department, as well as a pick-up truck operating as Utility 103. They also recently purchased a rescue truck, now operating as Support 103. Support 103 serves to replace Light and Air 103, as well as add more functionality to the department. Most of the volunteers are cross-trained as firefighters and emergency medical technicians. All have participated in hundreds of hours of training to meet state and national training standards.

== See also ==
- List of Arlington County Historic Districts
