= Judith Livers Brewer =

American firefighter

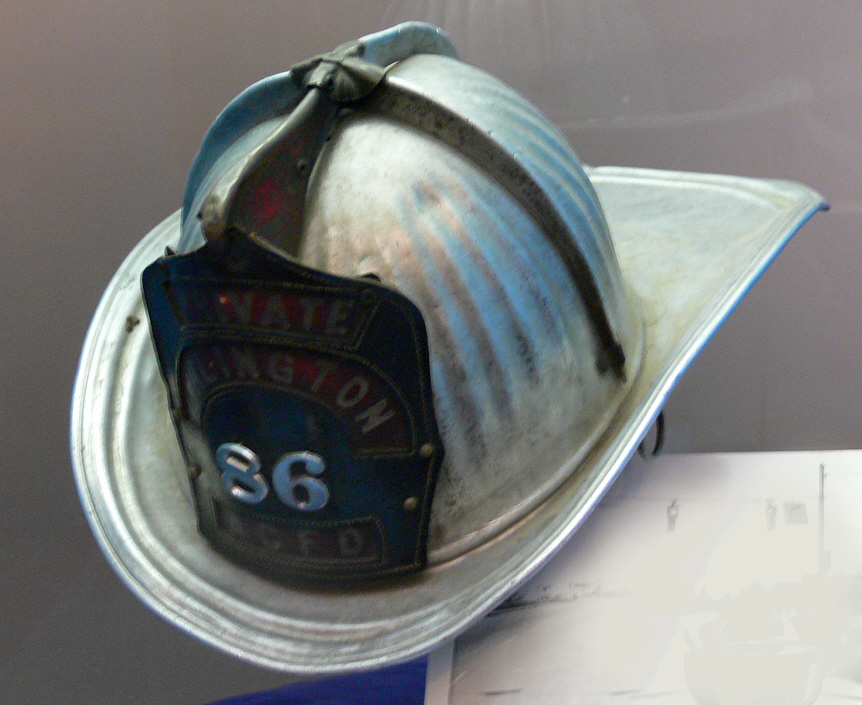
- Arlington County Fire Department helmet, worn by Judith Brewer, c. 1974
- Occupation: Firefighter
- Employer: Arlington County Fire Department
- Known for: First woman to become a career firefighter in the United States

Judith Livers Brewer (born c.1949) was the first woman in the United States to become a career firefighter and the first American woman to serve as a battalion chief.

== Biography ==
In 1974, Brewer, then Judith Livers, joined the Arlington County Fire Department in Arlington, Virginia making her the nation's first female career firefighter. She was assigned to Fire Station 4 located in Arlington's Clarendon neighborhood.

Brewer retired in 1999 at which time she was serving at the nation's first woman battalion chief, a rank she earned after 17 years of service.
