= Metropolitan Washington Airports Authority Fire and Rescue Department =

Metropolitan Washington Airports Authority Fire & Rescue Department

Operational area
- Country: United States
- State: Virginia
- Special District: Dulles International Airport; Washington National Airport

Agency overview
- Established: 1987
- Annual calls: 6,792 (2013 total): 4,352 (Dulles International); 2,440 (Reagan National)
- Employees: 157 (2015 total): 21 (Headquarters); 87 (Dulles International); 49 (Reagan National)
- Staffing: Career
- Fire chief: Interim
- EMS level: Advanced Life Support (ALS) and Basic Life Support (BLS)
- IAFF: IAFF Local 3217

Facilities and equipment
- Battalions: 2 Battalions
- Stations: 4 Fire Stations
- Engines: 4 Engine Companies
- Platforms: 1 Platform Truck
- Ambulances: 5 -Advanced Life Support (ALS) medic units 2 - Basic Life Support (BLS) Units
- HAZMAT: 1 HazMat Truck
- Airport crash: 9 Crash Trucks

Website
- Official website

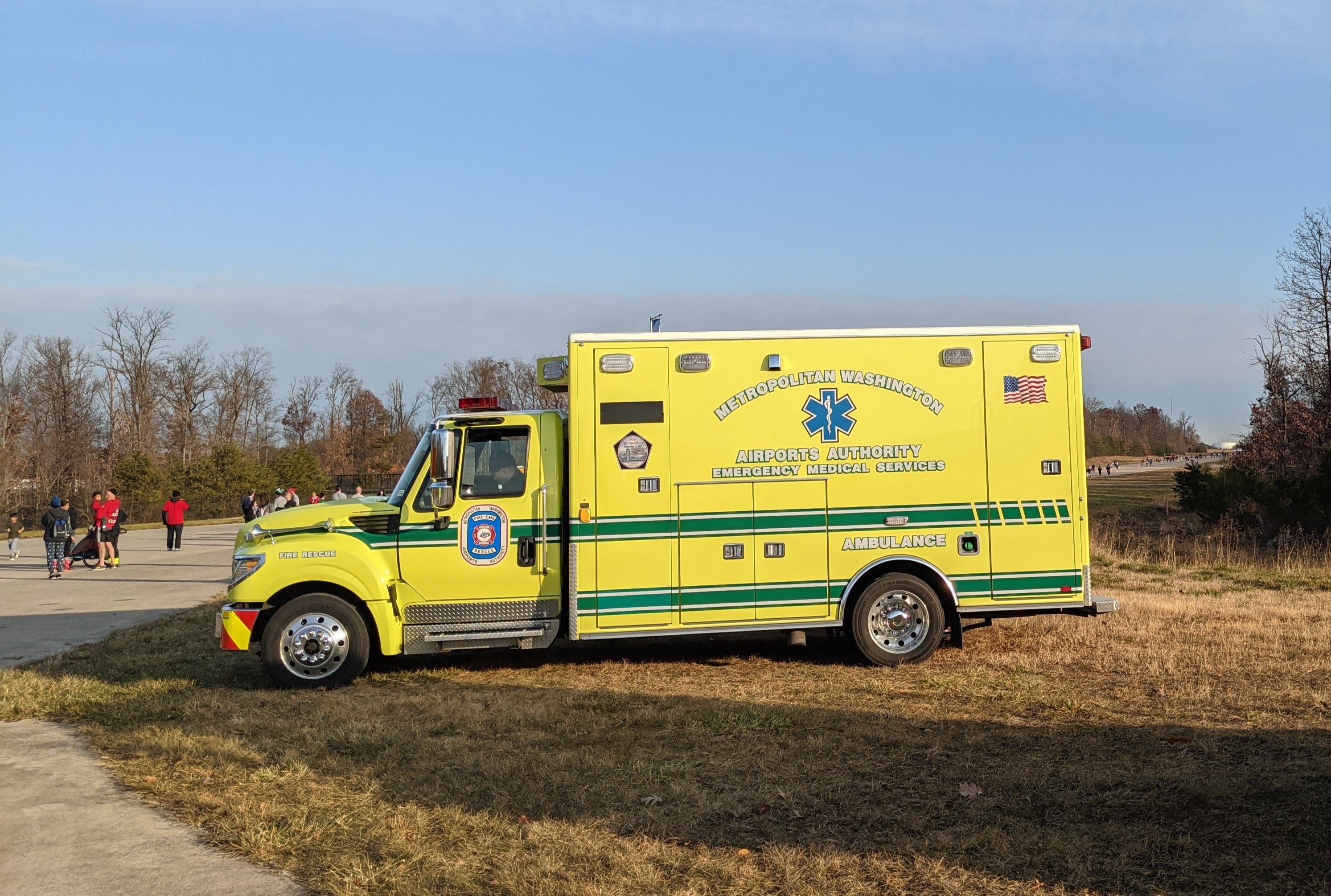
MWAA ambulance at Dulles Airport

The Metropolitan Washington Airports Authority Fire & Rescue Department is a special service fire department responsible for Ronald Reagan Washington National Airport and Washington Dulles International Airport in the Washington metropolitan area. The department was formed from the Federal Aviation Administration's Aircraft Rescue and Firefighting Branch when the Metropolitan Washington Airports Authority was established in June 1987. Prior to that time, both airports were owned and operated by the FAA.

== Area served ==
The Metropolitan Washington Airports Authority Fire and Rescue Department serves as the primary responders for the fire, rescue, and EMS response for Ronald Reagan Washington National Airport and Washington Dulles International Airport as well as portions of Virginia State Route 267 consisting of parts of the Dulles Toll Road and Dulles Airport Access Highway adjacent to the airport. They also respond through mutual aid agreements to protect a larger service area that includes Arlington County, City of Alexandria, Loudoun County, Fairfax County, Washington, D.C., and other surrounding counties within the Washington, D.C., Metropolitan Region. Mutual Aid responses have occurred outside the region to areas such as Baltimore City, MD for specialized equipment that the MWAA FRD possesses that was used at the Howard Street Tunnel fire.

== Station and apparatus ==
The department has a total of four stations split into two battalions. Battalion 301, which is home to station 301, is at Reagan-National while Battalion 302, home to stations 302, 303 and 304, are located at Dulles International. As of January 2018 this is a list of apparatus in use by the department:

| Station | Airport | Engine Company | Foam unit | Ambulance / Medic units | Tower company | Other units | Chief units |
|---|---|---|---|---|---|---|---|
| 301 | Reagan National | E301; E301B | 310 311 312 | A301; M301 M301B | | HazMat 301, MCSU 301, MCP 300, Utility 301 | BC301 |
| 302 | Dulles International | | 320 321; 322 | A302 M302 M302B | TW302 | Twin Agent 302, Special Ops 302; MCSU 302 | BC302 |
| 303 | Dulles International | E303; E303B | | A303 | | Safety 322 | |
| 304 | Dulles International | | 340 341 | | | Command Aide 321 | C320 |

== Notable incidents ==
=== Eastern Air Lines Flight 537 ===
On November 1, 1949, a Douglas C-54 Skymaster operated by Eastern Air Lines as flight 537 was coming in to land at Ronald Reagan Washington National Airport (DCA) when a Bolivian P-38 Lightning operating from nearby Bolling Air Force Base was declaring an emergency due to erratic operation of one of the engines. The two aircraft collided mid-air, killing all 51 passengers and 4 crewmembers on board and leaving the P-38 pilot with serious injuries.

=== Transpo '72 ===
The world's largest airshow of the time was held over a period of nine days at Dulles Airport from May 27 to June 4 of 1972, nicknamed Transpo '72. The event included all forms of transportation, including high speed rail demos and jumbo jets of the time. During the air show events, three separate fatal incidents occurred. The first involved a hang glider kite accident killing the pilot. The second incident during an aircraft race when a sport pilot crashed into a pylon and careened into the woods on the far side of the airstrip from the spectators killing him. The last incident was the first fatal accident for the United States Air Force Thunderbirds when Major Joe Howard lost power while flying his McDonnell Douglas F-4 Phantom II and ejected successfully from the crash. However, Maj. Howard was blown into the fireball from the crash, causing his parachute to melt and Maj. Howard to receive fatal injuries from the fall.

=== Air Florida Flight 90 ===
On January 13, 1982, Air Florida Flight 90, a Boeing 737, clipped the 14th Street Bridge before crashing into the Potomac River shortly after takeoff from National Airport. Of the 74 passengers and 5 crew members on board, only four passengers and one flight attendant survived the crash. In addition, due to heavy traffic on the bridge at the time from a snow storm impacting the region, four motorists in vehicles on the bridge were killed. The snow storm, and traffic congestion were noted to delay response and impede access of response resources throughout the region. Due to the deficiencies noted in the response in icy waters, the department improved their River Rescue capabilities with airboats capable of operating on surface ice of the river.

=== 9/11 ===
On September 11, 2001, a team of five al-Qaeda affiliated hijackers took control of American Airlines Flight 77, en route from Dulles International to Los Angeles International Airport, and deliberately crashed it into The Pentagon at 9:37 a.m. EDT as part of the September 11 attacks. All 64 people on the airliner were killed as were 125 people who were in the building. The impact of the plane severely damaged the structure of the building and caused its partial collapse. The MWAA Fire & Rescue Department units from Fire Station 301 were among the first units on scene at the Pentagon, and staff and equipment from both airports operated at the incident scene for several days past the initial incident operations.

=== 2025 Potomac River mid-air collision ===
On January 29, 2025, American Eagle Flight 5342, a scheduled domestic passenger flight operated by a Bombardier CRJ700 series airliner, collided mid-air with a United States Army Sikorsky UH-60L Black Hawk helicopter while on final approach to Ronald Reagan Washington National Airport. The flight originated from Wichita Dwight D. Eisenhower National Airport. Both aircraft crashed into the Potomac River, killing all 67 people on board the two aircraft. The MWAA Fire & Rescue Department was among the first agencies to arrive on the scene.
