= Metropolitan Medical Strike Team =

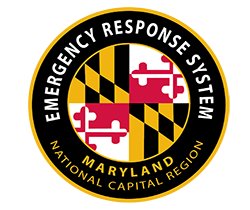
Metropolitan Medical Strike Team (MMST) logo for Maryland.

For emergency medical services, Metropolitan Medical Strike Teams (MMSTs) are federally established teams prepared to respond (if needed) to assist with medical management and public health consequences of chemical, biological and radiological incidents which result from accidental or deliberate acts.

The MMST is designed to supplement the local Haz-Mat and medical response to Weapons of Mass Destruction (WMD) attacks, by offering specialized equipment and knowledge, as well as additional Fire/EMS personnel, tactical and traditional law enforcement, physicians and nurses. These multi-jurisdictional, multi-disciplinary teams are trained to manage mass-casualty incidents.

The Atlanta-Fulton county MMST is an example of one such team. It is currently based around mutual aid between agencies on the local and state level.

== History ==
In the wake of the 1995 Tokyo subway sarin attack and the Oklahoma City bombing, US President Bill Clinton enacted Presidential Decision Directive 39 (PDD-39) on counterterrorism to prevent, respond and adapt to potential WMD attacks, including the creation of a coordinated network of emergency response agencies to deal with such scenarios. The Department of Health and Human Services (HHS), through its Office of Emergency Preparedness (OEP), founded the Metropolitan Medical Response System (MMRS) program in 1996, and establish two MMSTs for the metropolitan areas of Washington, D.C. and Atlanta.

Between 1995 and 1997, OEP and 50 other local and regional organizations of the DC metropolitan area collaborated towards the creation of a Washington DC MMST capable of responding to a WMD attack, resulting in the formation of a team of 110 people from various response agencies of the DC region. The DC MMST was supported by the joint coordination of Washington D.C., Arlington County, Virginia, Prince George's County, Maryland, and Montgomery County, Maryland administrations. The DC MMST was declared operational in December 1997 and prepared for potential WMD attacks during the 2000 Presidential election.

Atlanta was chosen as a second location for the establishment of an MMST, more focused on chemical and biological threats, due to the 1996 Summer Olympics taking place in the city. The Atlanta MMST was supported by the Chemical Biological Incident Response Force (CBIRF) of the United States Marine Corps and the Federal Bureau of Investigation's Hazardous Materials Response Unit (HMRU).
