= Taylor Farms =

American food company

Taylor Fresh Foods Inc.
- Type: Private
- Founded: 1995 as Taylor Fresh Foods
- Founders: Bruce Taylor
- Headquarters: Salinas, California, U.S.
- Key people: Bruce Taylor, CEO
- Products: Lettuce, broccoli, cauliflower, other vegetables
- Revenue: >US$7 billion (milestone announced 2026; period unspecified)
- Number of employees: 20,000
- Website: www.taylorfarms.com

Taylor Fresh Foods, Inc., doing business as Taylor Farms, is an American-based producer of fresh-cut fruits and vegetables, based in Salinas, California. The company was founded by former Fresh Express (now Chiquita) founder and CEO Bruce Taylor in 1995. As of 2009, Taylor Farms was ranked as the world's largest salad and fresh-cut vegetable processor. The company distributes its produce through third parties.

== History ==
Taylor Farms was established by Bruce Taylor, a third-generation member of a family in the fresh produce industry. Prior to Taylor Farms, Bruce Taylor founded Fresh Express, which Chiquita Brands later acquired from Performance Food Group. In 1995, Bruce Taylor and a group of partners founded Taylor Farms.

In May 2011, Taylor Farms acquired River Ranch Fresh Foods, LLC, incorporating it as a wholly owned subsidiary. However, River Ranch later closed operations in 2013.

In August 2015, the company moved their headquarters to downtown Salinas, California.

Taylor Farms acquired Earthbound Farm in 201 and in April 2024, acquired FarmWise, an agricultural technology robotics company specializing in precision weeding and thinning products.

The company took an approximate 16% stake in Pacific Valley Bancorp in 2025. In 2025 the company donated $2.1 million to super PACs, including $1 million to Make America Great Again Inc., and previously donated $800,000 to Americans for Prosperity's super PAC, AFP Action. It also hired Sidley Austin to lobby on behalf of the company beginning in 2025, spending over $850,000 on the effort.

== Operations ==
Taylor Farms supplies many of the largest supermarket chains and food service restaurants in the United States. Taylor Farms headquarters are located in Salinas, California, with 2,000 employees; and with regional processing plants in various locations.

Taylor Farms has faced difficulties with labor shortages, labor contractors, and salaries. In addition, the company has been subject to claims that they abused the 'temporary worker' contractors by keeping the 'temporary' employees as low-salaried long-term employees.

In 2012, Taylor Farms introduced fuel cell technology as an energy efficiency development, cutting energy costs at one facility by 30%. The company has also developed a facility utilizing power co-generation, wind, and solar energy.

Taylor Farms has supplied foods to Chipotle Mexican Grill, Costco, Golden State Foods, Jack in the Box, Markon, McDonald's, Olive Garden, Performance Food Group, Red Lobster, Sysco, Subway, US Foods, Walmart, and Yum! Brands (including KFC, Pizza Hut, and Taco Bell). It also sells food like bagged salad mixes under its own Taylor Farms brand. Taylor Farms has more than 25,000 employees and 30 processing plants.

They reported that its products account for approximately 40% of salad kits sold at U.S. grocery stores, highlighting the company's significant position in the prepared fresh-produce market.

== 2016 worker protests ==
In 2016, 900 employees of Taylor Farms protested in front of Chipotle restaurants in California, where Taylor Farms supplied tomatoes. The protests drew attention to working conditions at Taylor Farms, which they said included “poverty wages, disrespect, and severe violations of their most basic rights". The workers, represented by the labor union, the International Brotherhood of Teamsters, aimed to pressure Taylor Farms to negotiate labor contracts.

== Food safety and recalls ==
Drew McDonald, vice president of national quality systems for Taylor Farms, testified at a 2009 House panel convened to consider the Food Safety Enhancement Act of 2009. In this testimony, McDonald emphasized that Taylor Farms relies on preventive, science‑based safety systems to ensure product quality, arguing that traditional finished‑product testing is less effective. He also highlighted the company's major investments in modern facilities and processes to maintain high food‑safety standards.

Taylor Farms products were recalled three times in 2011 due to food safety concerns. In February, chicken and pork meals were recalled due to broccoli potentially infected with listeria. In May, there was a recall of salads mixed with grape tomatoes supplied by Florida growers. In October, Taylor Farms salad blends were recalled. No illnesses related to consumption of the recalled products were reported.

In 2012 and 2013, Taylor Farms recalled products six times. In 2012, Taylor Farms New Jersey voluntarily removed mangoes and other fruit mixes supplied to Wawa convenience stores in four states. Baby spinach was recalled in May due to salmonella contamination. In December, romaine was recalled for listeria contamination. In February 2013, Taylor Farms recalled organic baby spinach in 39 states for potential E.coli contamination. In August, the company recalled its salad mix after hundreds of cases of cyclosporiasis were linked to the Olive Garden and Red Lobster locations it supplies. In October, broccoli salad kits in seven states were recalled for possible listeria contamination in packets of salad dressing.

On October 25, 2024, Taylor Farms announced a recall after it was linked to the E. coli outbreak stemming from raw onions consumed at McDonald's that were sourced from the company. 104 people were impacted, including one death, with a FDA inspection finding numerous violations in food safety procedures at the Taylor Farms facility.

In March 2025, Taylor Farms contributed $1 million to Make America Great Again Inc., less than a week after the FDA announced it was delaying implementation of the "Food Traceability Rule".

=== 2026 cyclosporiasis outbreak ===
In July 2026, Taylor Farms was linked to a cyclosporiasis outbreak traced to iceberg lettuce sourced from central Mexico and served at Taco Bell and sold by other retailers. On July 17, 2026, Taylor Farms de Mexico announced it was voluntarily removing all iceberg lettuce sourced from central Mexico from the U.S. market and initiated a recall covering products in 27 states.

On July 18, 2026, the FDA reported that a lettuce sample supplied by Taylor Farms had tested positive for cyclospora. On July 19–20, the agency said laboratory experts had re-reviewed the result and concluded it was a false positive, and removed the sample information from its outbreak page. The FDA stated that the false positive did not change its investigation, saying "overwhelming epidemiological data" continued to link Taylor Farms lettuce to the outbreak. Taylor Farms said the FDA had informed it that the agency made a mistake and that no company product had tested positive. The FDA disputed the company's characterization that it had apologized, with an official saying it "did not offer an official apology, but did explain factually the issues."

Taylor Farms, through lobbyist Trent Morse, asked the White House to delay naming them in the outbreak. Former FDA commissioner Scott Gottlieb noted that was very unusual.

Coverage of the reversal drew renewed attention to Taylor Farms' political spending. Federal Election Commission filings show its parent company, Taylor Fresh Foods, donated $1 million to the pro-Trump super PAC MAGA Inc. in March 2025, days after the FDA announced a 30-month delay to its Food Traceability Rule. Taylor Farms said its executives had met with White House and FDA officials during the outbreak to raise concerns about the agencies' response process. No evidence has emerged that the donation or the meeting affected the FDA's handling of the investigation.

On October 22, 2026, further FDA investigations revealed the presence of Cyclospora in farms and processing facilities that provided the lettuce distributed by Taylor Fresh Foods. Positive samples were found in a tank holding outgoing wastewater and a drainage ditch. The presence of positive samples further corroborates the link between the Taylor Farms' distribution to the outbreak
