= Third-pound burger =

Hamburger type

A third-pound burger is a hamburger containing a patty that weighs one-third of a pound (approximately 5.3 ounces or 150 grams) before cooking. It is larger than a quarter-pound burger (4 ounces or 113 grams), which is commonly offered by fast-food chains. The third-pound burger became widely known in the 1980s following a marketing campaign by A&W Restaurants in the United States. The campaign, which sought to compete with McDonald's Quarter Pounder, was unsuccessful because consumers misunderstood fractions, making it a case study in consumer behavior and marketing communication.

== History ==
In the 1980s, A&W, under then-owner A. Alfred Taubman, sought to challenge McDonald's highly successful Quarter Pounder by introducing a larger, higher-quality hamburger. The campaign, called "Third is the Word," was designed to promote A&W's third-pound burger as a better value for the same price as McDonald's quarter-pound burger. Despite the promise of more meat for the same price, the campaign failed to resonate with consumers.

Taubman recounted the experience in his book, Threshold Resistance. He described how the company aggressively marketed the third-pound burger through TV and radio promotional spots, but sales remained lackluster. Confused as to why the burger was not selling, Taubman hired a market research firm to find out.

=== Marketing failure ===
The A&W research firm organized focus groups. The results revealed that many participants mistakenly believed that one-third of a pound was smaller than one-fourth (quarter) of a pound. Focus group participants expressed confusion over the price, asking why they should pay the same amount for a "smaller" third-pound burger.

This misunderstanding stemmed from consumers focusing on the numbers "3" and "4," leading them to conclude that one-third (1/3) was smaller than one-fourth (1/4), even though the opposite is true.

A similar explanation appeared in The New York Times in 2014, citing the third-pound burger as one of the most vivid examples of consumer arithmetic failure. In taste tests, customers actually preferred A&W's burger to McDonald's, and it was less expensive.

According to a CBC report, more than half of the people in a focus group about the burger said they didn't buy it because they thought they were getting less meat.

== Corporate response ==
Despite the failure of the campaign, Taubman later reflected on the incident, stating that "Sometimes the messages we send to our customers through marketing and sales information are not as clear and compelling as we think they are."

== See also ==
- Quarter Pounder
