= List of DePaul University alumni =

This is a list of notable alumni of DePaul University in Chicago.

== Academia ==
- David L. Callies, professor of law
- Isiaah Crawford, psychologist and 14th president of University of Puget Sound
- Tommy J. Curry, philosopher
- Mitra Emad, anthropologist
- Margaret Feldner, 21st president of Quincy University
- Graham Harman, philosopher

== Art ==
- Brandon Breaux, multi-disciplinary artist

== Business ==
- Ewart Abner, president of Motown Records
- George Ball, chairman of the W. Atlee Burpee Company
- Sean J. Conlon, businessman and real estate entrepreneur
- Richard Dennis, commodities speculator
- Richard Driehaus, CEO, Driehaus Capital Management
- Dan Evans, former vice president and general manager (2001–2004) of Los Angeles Dodgers
- Jack Greenberg, former CEO, McDonald's Corporation (BUS '64, JD '68)
- Kerrie L. Holley, chief architect of IBM Global Services and IBM distinguished engineer; IBM Black Engineer of the Year Award Recipient 2003
- Martin Jahn, general director, Volkswagen Group Russia
- James M. Jenness, former CEO, Kellogg Company (BUS '69, MBA '71)
- Philip Kotler (attended two years), professor in International Marketing at Northwestern University
- Daniel Ustian, former chairman, president and chief executive officer, Navistar International Corp.
- Zhu Yunlai, former CEO of the China International Capital Corporation

== Government and politics ==
- Anabel Abarca, alderperson of Chicago City Council
- Gaylon Alcaraz, community organizer and human rights activist
- Bushra Amiwala, youngest Muslim elected official in the United States
- Jaime Andrade Jr., Illinois state representative
- Frank Annunzio, U.S. representative from Illinois (1965–1993)
- Frances Cleveland Axtell, suffragist and politician
- Edwin B. Bederman, Illinois state representative
- Michael A. Bilandic, former mayor of Chicago
- Mike Bohacek, Indiana state senator
- Pat Boy, Indiana state representative
- Dorothy Brown, clerk of Cook County Circuit Court
- Anne M. Burke, Illinois Supreme Court justice, 1st District
- Joseph Burke, judge of the Illinois Appellate Court (1939–76)
- Ervin Bushati, Albanian ambassador to the United States
- Jonathan Carroll, Illinois state representative
- Edwin R. Chess, Chief of Chaplains of the United States Air Force
- Brad Christ, Missouri state representative
- Angela Clay, Chicago City Council alderperson
- Dorsey Crowe, Chicago City Council alderrperson
- Richard J. Daley, former mayor of Chicago
- Richard M. Daley, former mayor of Chicago
- Peter K. De Vuono, lawyer and Illinois state representative
- Marvin R. Dee, lawyer and Illinois state representative
- James DeLeo, Illinois state representative
- Paul Dinello, judge
- Joe Dunn, Illinois state representative
- Terrance Gainer, sergeant at arms of the United States Senate
- Arthur Goldberg (attended, did not graduate, transferred to Northwestern University), former justice of the United States Supreme Court
- Benjamin Hooks, former executive director of the NAACP
- Kelly Loeffler, former United States senator from Georgia
- Theodore Matlak, former 32nd ward Chicago alderman
- Walter J. Nega, Illinois state senator
- George Papadopoulos, oil and energy consultant, former member of the foreign policy advisory panel to Donald Trump's 2016 presidential campaign, and convicted felon
- Herb Schumann, former Cook County commissioner
- Samuel Skinner, former chief federal prosecutor, U.S. secretary of transportation; chief of staff to President George H. W. Bush
- Laura Spurr, chairwoman of the Nottawaseppi Huron Band of Potawatomi (2000–2001, 2003–2010)
- Charles E. Tucker, Jr., U.S. Air Force major general
- Tom Tuohy, lawyer and philanthropist
- Nadao Yoshinaga, Hawaii senator

== Athletes and sports figures ==
- Mark Aguirre, forward, NBA 1982–1994 (Dallas, Detroit)
- Bill Boedeker, halfback, NFL 1946–1950 (four teams)
- Jerry Bresler, basketball coach
- Andre Brown, forward, NBA 2007–2015
- Stanley Brundy (born 1967), American-Israeli forward, basketball player
- Latasha Byears, women's basketball player in the WNBA
- Franny Cerny, Czech, forward, Czech Women's First League 2019–present (currently with SK Slavia Prague)
- Wilson Chandler, forward, NBA 2007–2020
- Tyrone Corbin, forward, NBA 1985–2000 (nine teams)
- Dave Corzine, center, NBA 1978–1990 (five teams)
- Terry Cummings, forward, NBA 1982–2000 (seven teams)
- Carson Cunningham, basketball coach
- Kevin Edwards, guard, NBA 1988–2001 (four teams)
- Marty Embry, center, drafted by the Utah Jazz in 1986, played professionally overseas for 13 years
- Elene Gedevanishvili, Georgian figure skater
- Sarah Gorden, defender, NWSL 2016–present (currently with Chicago Red Stars)
- Stephen Howard, forward, NBA 1992–1998 (three teams)
- Kelli Hubly, defender, NWSL 2017–present (currently with Portland Thorns FC)
- Steven Hunter, center, NBA 2001–2010
- Johnny Jorgensen, guard, professional basketball, 1947-49
- Mabel Landry, track and field
- George Mikan, one of the NBA's 50 greatest players
- Nick Ongenda (born 2000), basketball player in the Israeli Basketball Premier League
- Angelo Poffo, professional wrestler; father of "Macho Man" Randy Savage
- Allie Quigley, guard, WNBA 2008–present (currently with Chicago Sky)
- Paul Reed, forward, NBA 2020–present (currently with the Detroit Pistons)
- Quentin Richardson, guard, NBA 2000–2013
- Bobby Simmons, guard, NBA 2001–2010
- Julianne Sitch, defender, NWSL 2001–2014
- Rod Strickland, guard, NBA 1988–2005 (nine teams)
- Max Strus, forward, NBA 2019–present (currently with the Cleveland Cavaliers)
- Erin Walter, midfielder, USL W-League 2006–2009

== Authors ==
- Kay Ulanday Barrett, poet, educator, cultural worker
- Miriam Del Banco, poet
- William Granger, Chicago Tribune and Chicago Sun-Times columnist; author of The November Man series of novels
- Patrick Hicks, novelist, poet
- Tarell Alvin McCraney, playwright and winner of 2017 Oscar for Best Adapted Screenplay
- Thomas Moore, author of Care of the Soul
- Charlotte Pence, author of A Day in the Life of Marlon Bundo
- Christian Picciolini, former extremist and political activist; author of the autobiography Romantic Violence: Memoirs of an American Skinhead;
- Sheila Radford-Hill, author of Further To Fly: Black Women and the Politics of Empowerment, and professor at Dominican University
- Sean Stephenson, author of Get Off Your "But"

== Musicians ==
- Susan Abod, musician
- Jason Adasiewicz, jazz vibraphonist and composer
- Josie Aiello, singer-songwriter
- Ahmad Alaadeen, jazz saxophonist
- Jeremy Barnes, drummer of indie rock bands Neutral Milk Hotel, Bright Eyes
- Irwin Bazelon, classical music composer
- Bitch, musician
- Rob Bochnik, musician
- Jerry Bresler, conductor, songwriter, and musician
- Don Caneva, band director and conductor
- Liz Carroll, fiddler and composer
- Edo Castro, jazz bassist and composer
- Frank Catalano, jazz saxophonist
- Paul Cienniwa, harpsichordist
- Ryan Cohan, jazz musician
- Brian Culbertson, jazz musician
- Cyn, singer and songwriter
- Greg Davis, musician, sound artist
- Orbert Davis, jazz trumpeter and bandleaderOrbert Davis
- Nohema Fernández, pianist
- Tristen Gaspadarek, singer-songwriter
- James William Guercio, producer for the band Chicago and former owner of Country Music Television
- Mark Jaeschke, musician, member of bands Joie De Vivre and Kittyhawk
- Terry Kath, guitarist and vocals for the band Chicago
- Lorin Levee, principal clarinet for the Los Angeles Philharmonic
- Ramsey Lewis, jazz musician
- Lee Loughnane, trumpet player for the band Chicago
- Abraham Lubin, Hazzan
- Ray Manzarek, keyboardist for 1960s rock band The Doors
- Kris Myers, drummer of the Chicago-based progressive rock group Umphrey's McGee
- Tim Nordwind, bass and vocals for the band Ok Go
- Jim O'Rourke, Grammy Award-winning producer, composer, musician, sound-artist
- James Pankow, trombone player for the band Chicago
- Walter Parazaider, woodwind player for the band Chicago
- George Perle, Pulitzer Prize-winning composer
- Christian Picciolini, guitarist for Random55; CEO of Goldmill Group; former CEO of Sinister Muse Records and Chaos Records
- Matana Roberts, Saxophonist and Composer
- Rio Romeo, singer-songwriter, musician, producer
- David Safran, singer-songwriter and producer

== Film, theater and media personalities ==
- Theoni V. Aldredge
- Tom Amandes
- Gillian Anderson (THE '90)
- Kevin Anderson
- Tisha Terrasini Banker
- John C. Becher
- Cole Bennett
- Desmin Borges
- Tom Bosley
- Terry Bozeman
- Jerry Bresler
- W. Earl Brown
- Janai Brugger
- Julianne Buescher
- P.J. Byrne
- John Cabrera
- Paula Cale
- Sean Cassidy
- Monique Coleman
- David Dastmalchian
- Dana DeLorenzo
- Paul Dinello
- Tsi-Tsi-Ki Félix
- Judy Greer
- Sean Gunn
- Zach Helm
- Linda Hunt
- Simran Judge
- Stana Katic
- Joe Keery
- Lisa Robin Kelly
- Alexander Koch
- Harvey Korman
- Sarah Kustok
- Lauren Lapkus
- Cody Lassen
- Denny Love
- Karl Malden
- Joe Mantegna
- Halloween Martin
- Jane McNeill
- Reese Mishler
- Michael Muhney
- Tom O'Horgan
- Zak Orth
- Geraldine Page
- Betsy Palmer
- Elizabeth Perkins
- Christian Picciolini
- Amy Pietz
- Prabjot (PJ) Randhawa
- John C. Reilly
- Leonard Roberts
- Michael Rooker
- Arthur Spivak
- Kate Steinberg
- Mehran C. Torgoley
- Jaboukie Young-White
- Todd Zuniga

== Journalism and media ==
- Jerry Bresler, editor and journalist
- Lourdes Duarte, television journalist

== Science and technology ==
- Dr. Richard H. Lawler, transplant pioneer
- Mary Alice McWhinnie, biologist, Antarctic researcher
- Robert Plomin, psychologist and geneticist best known for his work in twin studies and behavior genetics

== Religion ==
- Michael James Dempsey, Catholic prelate
- John Joseph Egan, Catholic priest
- Jerome E Listecki, Catholic prelate, archbishop emeritus of Milwaukee, 1976 Juris Doctor
- Robert Prevost, The Pope Leo XIV

== Other ==
- Todd Beamer (Class of 1993), software salesperson; hero on United Airlines Flight 93 during the September 11 attacks
- Shirien Damra, illustrator, designer, artist, and activist
- Chelsea Tayui, Miss Universe Ghana 2020
