= List of people from Highland Park, Illinois =

The following list includes notable people who were born or have lived in Highland Park, Illinois. For a similar list organized alphabetically by last name, see the category page People from Highland Park, Illinois.

== Academics and sciences ==
- Elisha Gray, invented and demonstrated a telephone in 1874; his Hazel Avenue house still stands
- Dr. John Grunsfeld, astronaut
- Eric Isaacs, director of Argonne National Laboratory and a professor at University of Chicago; lived in Highland Park
- Dr. John Preskill, professor at the California Institute of Technology
- Dr. Jeremy Siegel, Russell E. Palmer Professor of Finance at the Wharton School of the University of Pennsylvania
- Dr. Graham Spanier, president of Penn State University
- Dr. Peter Suber, leader in the movement for open access to research
- Aaron Swartz, pioneer in internet technology and activism for free digital culture
- A. Judson Wells (1917-2008), Chemist

== Arts and entertainment ==
- Craig Bolotin, screenwriter, film director
- Alex Borstein, actress
- Paul Brickman, film director
- Rachel Brosnahan, actress
- Patrick Burns, reality TV star (Haunting Evidence)
- Jacqueline Carey, fantasy fiction novelist
- Mickie Caspi, artist
- Billy Corgan, lead singer and founder of the band Smashing Pumpkins
- Blag Dahlia, singer in The Dwarves
- Eric Engberg, broadcast journalist
- Brenda Ferber, author
- Jennie Fields, writer, author of Crossing Brooklyn Ferry, Lily Beach, and The Middle Ages
- Brett Gelman, actor
- Michael Gelman, producer, Live With Regis and Kelly
- Stephen Glass, discredited magazine journalist
- James Goldman, screenwriter and playwright, author of The Lion in Winter
- William Goldman, Academy Award-winning screenwriter, author of The Princess Bride
- F. Gary Gray,
- Brian Levant, film director
- Donald Lipski, artist
- Sebastian Maniscalco, comedian
- Richard Marx, singer-songwriter, producer
- Jeff Melvoin, television writer and producer
- Claud Mintz, singer
- Ken Olin, actor, director, producer
- Peter Orner, author
- Jeff Perry, actor
- Cory Provus, baseball broadcaster
- Robert Reed, actor
- David Safran, musician and writer
- Ben Savage, actor
- Fred Savage, actor and director
- Josh Server, actor
- Robert Seyfarth, architect
- Gary Sinise, actor
- Grace Slick, of the band Jefferson Airplane, born in Highland Park
- Kevin Symons, actor
- Harold Ramis, actor and director
- Brandon Ratcliff, actor
- Brian Ross, broadcast journalist
- David Seltzer, screenwriter, producer, and director
- Gene Siskel, film critic
- George Kirke Spoor, film pioneer
- Lauren Tom, actress
- D.B. Weiss, co-creator of Game of Thrones TV series
- Orson Welles, actor and director
- Edward Weston, photographer
- Dan Witz, artist
- Dean Zelinsky, founder of Dean Guitars

== Business ==
- Anthony Saliba, (born 1955), author & businessman
- Steve Sarowitz (born 1965/1966), American billionaire, founder of Paylocity

== Military ==
- Major General "Terrible Terry" Allen, World War II commander of 1st Infantry Division; featured on the cover of Time magazine
- General Mark W. Clark, US Army general (World War II and the Korean War), lived in Highland Park
- Stansfield Turner, Admiral, U.S. Navy and Director of the Central Intelligence Agency, was a graduate of Highland Park High School.
- General Jonathan M. Wainwright, commander of Allied forces in the Philippines at the time of their surrender to the Empire of Japan, attended Highland Park High School

== Politics and law ==
- Lane Bray, Washington state legislator; born in Highland Park
- Bill Cassidy, U.S. senator for Louisiana; born in Highland Park
- Lauren Beth Gash, Illinois state legislator and lawyer; lived in Highland Park
- Mark Kirk, United States senator; lived in Highland Park
- Fayette S. Munro, Illinois state legislator and lawyer; lived in Highland Park
- Daniel M. Pierce, Illinois state legislator who served three nonconsecutive terms as Mayor of Highland Park; lifelong resident.
- Rob Sherman, atheist activist, perennial candidate, and businessman; grew up in Highland Park
- Jill Stein, 2012 and 2016 Green Party presidential candidate; grew up in Highland Park
- Grace Mary Stern, Illinois state legislator; lived in Highland Park
- Stansfield Turner, United States admiral and Director of Central Intelligence; born in Highland Park
- Brad Schneider, United States representative
- David Shulkin, United States Secretary of Veterans Affairs
- Howard R. Slater, Illinois state legislator and lawyer; lived in Highland Park
- Paul Soglin, mayor of Madison, Wisconsin graduated from Highland Park High School

== Sports ==
=== Baseball ===
- Ross Baumgarten, pitcher for the Chicago White Sox and Pittsburgh Pirates, was born in Highland Park
- Ryan Borucki, relief pitcher for the Toronto Blue Jays, was born in Highland Park
- Tony Cogan, relief pitcher for the Kansas City Royals, attended Highland Park High School

=== Basketball ===
- Michael Jordan (born 1963), iconic basketball player for the Chicago Bulls, six-time NBA champion, Olympic gold medalist, lived in Highland Park
- Toni Kukoč, forward for the Chicago Bulls and other NBA teams, lives in Highland Park
- Scottie Pippen, Chicago Bulls forward, six-time NBA champion and Basketball Hall-of-Famer
- Justin Smith (born 1999), basketball player in the Israeli Basketball Premier League

=== Football ===
- Tunch Ilkin, offensive tackle for Pittsburgh Steelers and Green Bay Packers, sports broadcaster, attended Highland Park High School
- Hugh "Shorty" Ray, football official, member of Pro Football Hall of Fame, was born in Highland Park

=== Gymnastics ===
- Jasmine Kerber, U.S. National rhythmic gymnast, resides in Highland Park

=== Hockey ===
- Billy Jaffe, hockey analyst, born in Highland Park
- David Meckler, professional hockey player, was born in Highland Park

=== Skating ===
- Jason Brown, figure skater, 2015 national champion and medalist at 2014 Winter Olympics in Sochi, Russia, attended Highland Park High School

=== Tennis ===
- Seymour Greenberg (1920–2006), tennis player; lived in Highland Park
- Robert Wrenn (1873–1925), tennis player; won the US Championship Men's Singles title four times, was born in Highland Park

=== Motorsports ===
- Brian Redman, champion road racing driver, lived and worked in Highland Park when driving for Carl Haas
