= Alice Vonk =

American floriculturist (1908–1997)

Alice Vonk (1908–1997) was an American floriculturist. She received the $10,000 prize for creating the whitest marigold in David Burpee's seed challenge. The competition was run by Burpee's seed company, W. Atlee Burpee & Co, founded by his father Washington Atlee Burpee. The $10,000 prize makes her flower the costliest marigold in the world, and the costliest flower in the world at the time.

Burpee Seeds' quest for a white marigold started 56 years before Vonk's creation. It started running in 1954, and was ended by Vonk in 1975. Before winning her prize, Vonk received $100 from Burpee seeds the previous year along with five other gardeners for having seeds that produced close to white flowers. Vonk kept seeds from the lightest flowers in her garden each season, replanting for over two decades before achieving a pure white marigold that measured 2.5 inches in diameter.

Alice Vonk, born in 1908, had been gardening since she was 11 and had no formal science training.
