= Sheffield, New Brunswick =

Community in New Brunswick, Canada

Coordinates: 45.883°N 66.300°W

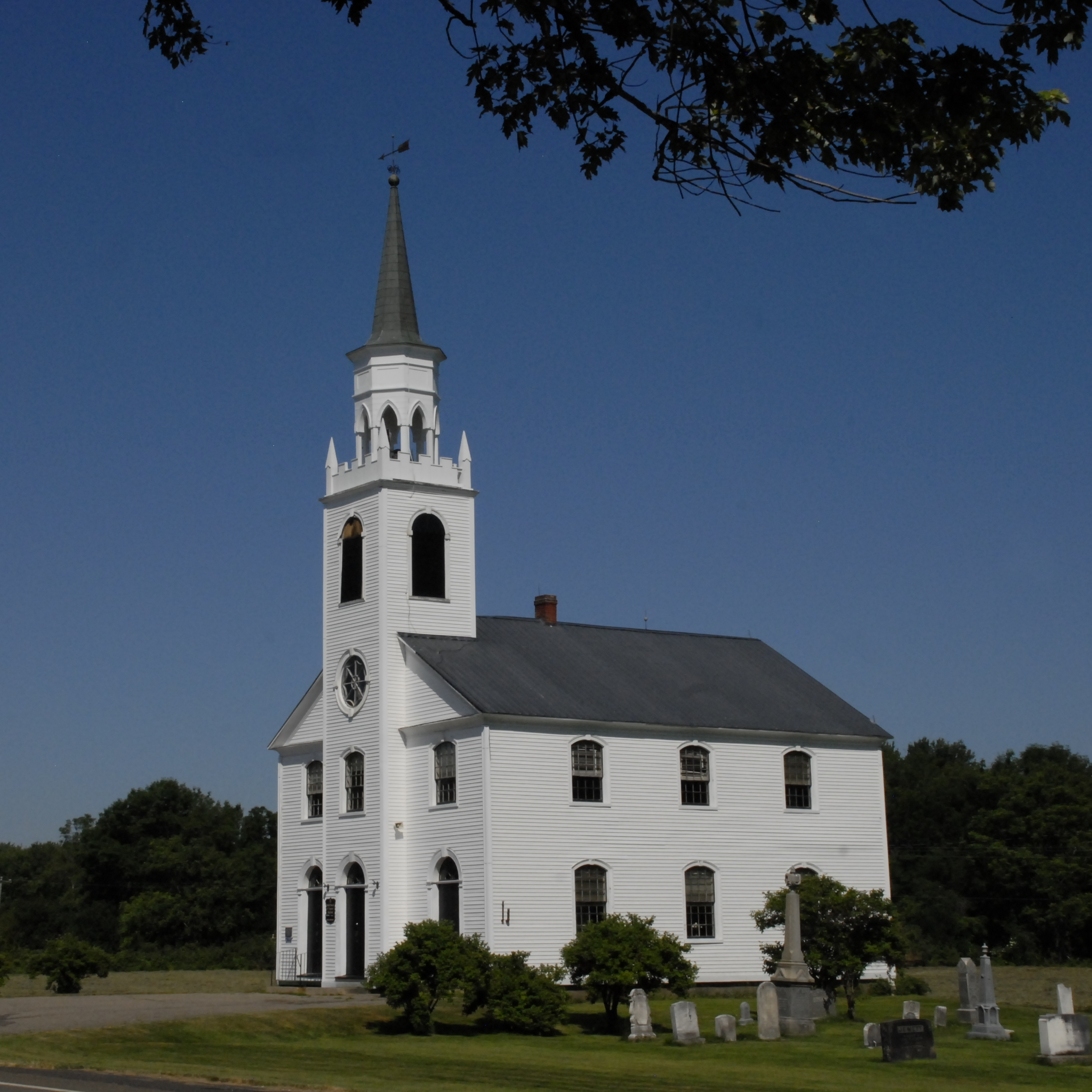
Sheffield United Church in Sheffield NB, built in 1775 and rebuilt in 1840

Sheffield is a community in Sunbury County in the Canadian province of New Brunswick. It lies within the St. John River valley and is served by New Brunswick Route 105 (former Trans-Canada Highway) and New Brunswick Route 695.

== Notable people ==
The founder of Burpee Seeds, W. Atlee Burpee was from Sheffield.

== See also ==
- List of communities in New Brunswick
