= George Ball (American businessman) =

American businessman

George Carl Ball Jr. is an American seedsman who has served as chairman of W. Atlee Burpee Company since 1991.

== Background and Career ==
After studying at Bard College and DePaul University, he joined Ball Seed in the late 1970s. He later worked as a marketing executive at Pan American Seed, where he was named president in 1984. When the opportunity presented itself, George Ball acquired Burpee, and took on the roles of Burpee's CEO and Chairman.

George Ball is currently Chairman of the Board of the Burpee Foundation and a trustee of the Horticultural Society of New York. From 1990 to 1993, he served as the president of the American Horticultural Society—the youngest in the organization's history. George Ball has served as a trustee on numerous boards, including Bard College (1996–2001), The Orme School (1995–2000), and The National Gardening Association. He was President of his family foundation for two years (2000–2002).

George Ball also participated in numerous seed relief efforts. In February 2004, he contributed to what can be categorized as the largest vegetable seed relief shipment in history involving aid to farmers in Iraq—in collaboration with the Coalition Partnership Authority and United States Department of Defense.

He gave the 2007 commencement speech at the Orme School.

Under George Ball's direction in 2016, W. Atlee Burpee Company and the Burpee Foundation provided a $2.5 million gift to permanently preserve and maintain the White House Kitchen Garden installed by First Lady Michelle Obama. In a statement announcing the initiative, Ball stated, "Everyone at Burpee is proud of the First Lady’s ‘Can-Do!’ attitude and we hope that a well-conceived long-lasting version of The White House Kitchen Garden will be fully supported by ensuing Administrations for so long as The White House serves as the residence for The President of the United States."

== Awards and Recognition ==
George Ball's awards include the Wilfred Jung Distinguished Service Award from the Garden Writers Association of America, the Outstanding Achievement Award from the Horticulture Society of New York, the President's Medal of Appreciation from the American Horticultural Society, and the "Design 100" from Metropolitan Home magazine.

In 2016, George Ball was awarded the degree of Doctor of Science, honoris causa from Delaware Valley University in recognition of his outstanding professional accomplishments and community outreach.

In 2023, Mr. Ball was awarded the degree of Doctor of Humane Letters from his alma mater, Bard College—"His ability to see beyond what others might see makes George Ball a visionary who continues to nurture innovation in the horticultural world."

== Politics ==
Despite his notable collaboration with the Obama White House on the White House Kitchen Garden, George Ball is a long time financial contributor to the Republican Party and its candidates, including those widely considered to be on the far right of the political spectrum such as Joe Kent and Richard Mourdock. Ball contributed a total of $8,100 ($2,700 above the legal maximum at the time) to the Ted Cruz campaign during the 2016 Republican primaries. Later that year, Ball contributed a total of $400,000 to Trump Victory, joint fundraising committee of the Donald Trump 2016 presidential campaign and the Republican National Committee. In 2020, Ball's contributions included a total of $200,000 to the Senate Leadership Fund, a super PAC supporting GOP candidates for the United States Senate. In 2022, Ball contributed $250,000 to American Leadership Action, a super PAC supporting Mehmet Oz's campaign for US Senate. In 2024, he contributed a total of $100,000 to the Trump 47 Committee, joint fundraising committee of the Donald Trump 2024 presidential campaign and the Republican National Committee.

== Published works ==
George Ball's opinion articles have appeared in The New York Times, The Wall Street Journal, The Washington Post, The Chicago Tribune, The Philadelphia Inquirer, the San Francisco Chronicle, and many other newspapers:

- "Our Love is Growing" Times Leader May 9, 2026
- "Easter and gardens: The roots of religion are universally agricultural" The Sacramento Bee April 5, 2026
- "With the joyous arrival of spring, life seems to appear in beautiful color once again" The Sacramento Bee March 28, 2025
- "A home garden can bring color and savings" The Gazette (Cedar Rapids, Iowa) March 23, 2024
- "Join me in a toast to the sun" Quad-City Times December 31, 2023
- "What motivates Americans to garden? Not tangible rewards, but emotional benefits" The Sacramento Bee September 7, 2023
- "The Vitruvian Garden" The Roanoke Times March 21, 2023 (subscription required)
- "Covid Isolation Sows a Gardening Boom" The Wall Street Journal January 3, 2022 (subscription required)
- "The garden machine" The Spokesman Review June 19, 2021
- "The Growing Trend: Why we’re turning to gardening at a record pace" The Morning Call March 20, 2021
- "Growing Hybrid Politics; Congress’ monoculture must evolve" The Spokesman Review January 3, 2021
- "Finding the garden at the end of the tunnel" The Morning Call December 15, 2020
- "Summer's Second Act: 'Bonus' gardening season is here" The Fayetteville Observer August 14, 2020
- "The Green Light" The Spokesman Review June 20, 2020
- "Three cheers for the Fourth" St. Louis Post-Dispatch July 3, 2019
- "The olive branch of government" Casper Star Tribune May 3, 2019
- "Gardens, and humans, find renewal in the sun’s spring equinox" The Fresno Bee March 18, 2019
- "Santa's second job" Bakersfield Californian December 25, 2018
- "Conquering the great tomato taste crisis" The Cedar Rapids Gazette September 16, 2018
- "The garden is the real social network" Casper Star Tribune July 24, 2018
- "It's summer solstice Thursday: Join nature in celebrating the longest day of the year" Omaha World-Herald June 20, 2018
- "Let there be light" Casper Star Tribune March 20, 2018
- "Celebrate your ‘roots’ in this Year of the Dog" The Desert Sun (Palm Springs, California), February 15, 2018
- "Mistletoe is an Endangered Species" The Wall Street Journal December 21, 2017
- "In Defense of Broccoli" The Wall Street Journal November 6, 2017
- "Opinion: Summer's ending, but there's still time to grow" The Reading Eagle August 30, 2017
- "For Stephen Hawking, a brief history of human potential" The Philadelphia Inquirer July 21, 2017
- "Growing a better health care policy" The Desert Sun (Palm Springs, California), May 24, 2017
- "Please, Melania Trump, Save the White House Kitchen Garden" The Chicago Tribune, January 31, 2017
- "How Trump Can Have His Best First 100 Days: Eat His Veggies" The Washington Post, January 7, 2017
- "The Only Way to 'Drain the Swamp' for Good" The Wall Street Journal, December 26, 2016
- "Happy birthday: e pluribus garden" Omaha World-Herald, July 4, 2016
- "Ode to the Original Workplace" Pittsburgh Post-Gazette, September 6, 2015
- "Our Personal Climate Change"The Philadelphia Inquirer June 28, 2015
- "The winter is a garden, too"The Philadelphia Inquirer January 18, 2015
- "Daylight Saving - Now Is Not The Time" The Wall Street Journal, October 31, 2014 (subscription required)
- "Spring is Here—Why Take a Break?" The Wall Street Journal, March 19, 2014
- "Seeds Of Good Health"The Philadelphia Inquirer January 28, 2014
- "Find Sanctuary in Gardens" The Post and Courier (Charleston, South Carolina) December 25, 2013
- "Common Core standards are 'curriculum upsidedownia'" San Francisco Chronicle August 18, 2013
- "Where have all the flowers gone?"The Philadelphia Inquirer August 14, 2013
- "The season of salvation" The Providence Journal March 19, 2013
- "The People v. Broccoli'" Pittsburgh Post-Gazette August 12, 2012
- "Independence Day is America's 'Happiness' holiday" Lincoln Journal Star July 3, 2012
- Irish roots: The potato's role in history goes far beyond the famine Pittsburgh Post-Gazette, March 16, 2012
- Hybrid veggies are the cream of the crop The Philadelphia Inquirer December 23, 2011
- Ode To Green Autumn Pittsburgh Post-Gazette, September 25, 2011
- 2011: "The Year of the Vegetable" The Wall Street Journal, July 3, 2011 (subscription required)
- "How our public gardens can grow" The Philadelphia Inquirer June 21, 2011
- "Take one dose of Happiness Garden" The Philadelphia Inquirer May 24, 2011
- "Springtime for veggies" Pittsburgh Post-Gazette, March 21, 2011
- 2011: "The Year of the Vegetable" The Wall Street Journal January 3, 2011
- "Heirloom fundamentalists go too green" The Atlanta Journal-Constitution July 26, 2010
- "The empire beckons back?" The Philadelphia Inquirer July 1, 2010
- Sober "Reflection is in Order" The Philadelphia Inquirer June 10, 2010
- "Consider Massive 'Manmade Personal Climate Change'" The Providence Journal April 18, 2010
- "Allow resolutions to grow, bear fruit" The Atlanta Journal-Constitution December 29, 2009
- "Seeds: Nature's Microchips" The Wall Street Journal, August 14, 2009 (subscription required)
- "A garden in every backyard" The Philadelphia Inquirer July 3, 2009
- "Naturalism Has Been Hijacked" The Wall Street Journal, June 13, 2009 (subscription required)
- "Garden of Manners on First Day of Spring"The Providence Journal March 19, 2009
- "Grow Your Investment" The Providence Journal March 10, 2009
- "George Ball: Mix and match" Star Tribune (Minneapolis), February 20, 2009
- "The Green Card" The Wall Street Journal November 6, 2006
- "Politicians should cultivate Garden Party" Seattle Post-Intelligencer October 2, 2006
- "$11 million is fair price for Heronswood botanical garden" Seattle Post-Intelligencer August 3, 2006
- "Border War" The New York Times March 19, 2006
- "How Does Your Garden Grow?; Stand Up For Hybrids" The New York Times March 21, 1993

== Quoted stories ==
- "The New Trend in Home Gardens—Landscaping to Calm Anxiety" The Wall Street Journal March 12, 2021
- "Fill your vegetable garden with heirloom seeds rich in Philly history" The Philadelphia Inquirer February 12, 2021
- "A bumper crop of home gardens blossoms amid a pandemic" The Philadelphia Inquirer July 19, 2020
- "5 Vegetable Seeds You Can Plant Now For Your Summer Garden" Huffington Post May 19, 2020
- "Gardens on the rise due to COVID-19" High Plains Journal May 2, 2020
- "Seeds and Plants are Selling Out—But Here’s Where You Can Still Get Them" House Beautiful April 28, 2020
- "Need for seed: Gardeners flock to stores, overwhelm websites" The Associated Press April 16, 2020
- "Seed sellers can't keep up as Americans grow their own food" CBS News April 14, 2020
- "Seed sales soar as Mainers put down roots at home" Portland Press Herald April 6, 2020
- "Thanks to coronavirus, Lehigh Valley gardens are growing" The Morning Call April 15, 2020
- "Emptier grocery shelves help cultivate a growing interest in home gardening" WHYY March 26, 2020
- "Opt for fundamentals, not flash, when shopping for plants" The Associated Press December 10, 2019
- "More sculptures by renowned artist Steve Tobin coming to Easton" The Morning Call July 6, 2018
- "Delaware Valley University and Burpee to Partner on Research Program" Delaware Valley University March 12, 2018
- "Undercover Garden" The Morning Call February 16, 2018
- "What’s coming in 2018? Crazy good tomatoes and sunflowers" The Sacramento Bee January 5, 2018
- "Pocket-size seed packets speak volumes to gardeners" The Associated Press December 26, 2017
- "Sculptures by famed artist Steve Tobin installed in Easton this week" The Morning Call October 25, 2017
- "Melania Trump's grandfather was an onion farmer. This company wants to make his onion famous" The Washington Post July 18, 2017
- "Die Lock-Zwiebel". Spiegel. July 7, 2017.
- "Fans of White House Garden Hope New Tenants Keep It Green" The New York Times July 2, 2017
- "Chelsea Flower Show was a showcase supreme" The Providence Journal June 1, 2017
- "Tough-as-nails beauties thrive here" The Columbus Dispatch May 28, 2017
- "White House kitchen garden will live on during Trump administration" The Dallas Morning News May 4, 2017
- "Will first lady Melania Trump OK first beets for White House Kitchen Garden?" The Sacramento Bee March 31, 2017
- "Looking for a Trump Doctrine in the White House Kitchen" The New York Times February 27, 2017
- "Michelle Obama’s White House kitchen garden to become permanent feature" The Washington Times October 5, 2016
- "Burpee's Fordhook Farm: A visit to one of the world's leading seed breeding companies" Cleveland Plain Dealer September 15, 2016
- "Free flower seed packets remind of Lady Bird Johnson's legacy" Chicago Tribune May 24, 2016
- "Growing bountiful tomatoes a Sacramento tradition, obsession" The Sacramento Bee February 17, 2016
- "Living large in the vegetable garden" The Sacramento Bee January 29, 2016
- "Gardeners urged to join 'Butterfly and Bee Brigade' to stem pollinator losses" The Waterloo-Cedar Falls Courier April 12, 2015
- "George Ball on the future of gardening" Associated Press December 30, 2013
- "The fall garden" The Philadelphia Inquirer September 12, 2011
- "Burpee promotes 'fast-food garden'" Milwaukee Journal Sentinel January 25, 2011
- "Plant breeders develop seeds for colorful edibles" Milwaukee Journal Sentinel January 25, 2011
- "Want your kids to eat right? Hand them some seeds" Houston Chronicle January 21, 2011
- "Tomato lovers sound off on heirlooms vs. hybrids" USA Today June 14, 2010
- "How's your garden grow? $1,000 in veggies for a $100 investment? It's easy." The Philadelphia Inquirer April 29, 2010
- "You Say Tomato. They Say Phony." The Wall Street Journal April 21, 2010
- "A White House garden that produces more than vegetables" USA Today April 13, 2009
- "Economy turns gardening into growth industry" NBC News March 15, 2009
- "Cuttings; A Test Garden That Does Burpee Proud" The New York Times September 15, 2002
- "Cuttings; Where Burpee First Tilled" The New York Times August 23, 1992
- "Sow your seeds indoors" The Philadelphia Inquirer
