= Fordhook Farm =

- U.S. National Register of Historic Places
- U.S. Historic district
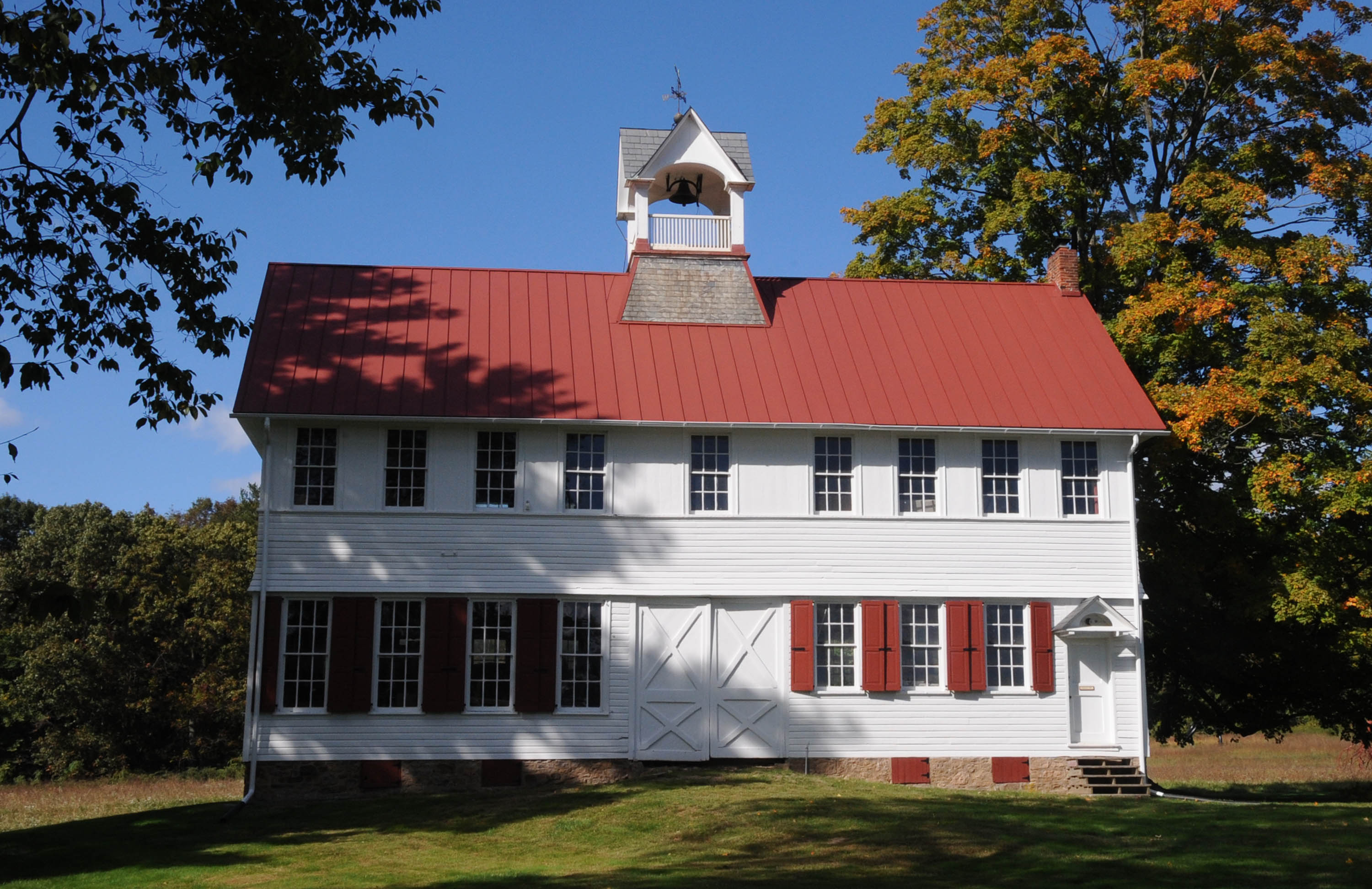
- Fordhook Farm Barn, October 2010

- Location within Pennsylvania Location within the United States
- Location: 105 New Britain Rd., Doylestown Township, Pennsylvania
- Coordinates: 40°17′52″N 75°09′01″W
- Area: 16 acres (6.5 ha)
- Built: 1888
- Architect: Lee, Charles
- Architectural style: Colonial, Queen Anne
- NRHP reference No.: 87000674
- Added to NRHP: April 30, 1987

Fordhook Farm, also known as Burpee Farm, is an historic farm and national historic district located at Doylestown Township, Bucks County, Pennsylvania. It encompasses 12 contributing buildings and 2 contributing structures. They include the houses, barn, spring house, ice house, carriage house, "farm house," "cottage" and seed house, and two greenhouses. The main house is constructed of fieldstone, and the oldest section pre-dates 1798. Washington Atlee Burpee (1858-1915) purchased the farm in 1888. The farm was used for experimentation and seed production by Burpee Seeds until 1981.

It was added to the National Register of Historic Places in 1987.
