= Seed-counting machine =

Machines that count seeds for research and packaging

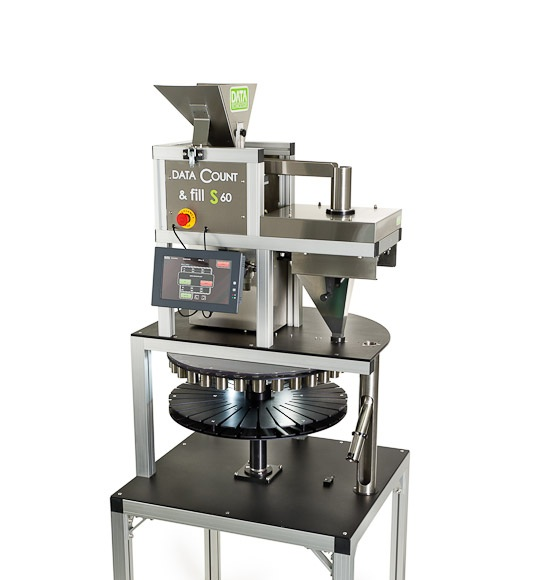
- A seed counter and packager
- Industry: Agriculture
- Application: Counting seeds

A seed-counting machine is an automated industrial device used in agriculture and packaging to accurately count seeds. Originally developed to replace manual counting and weight-based estimation, these machines have evolved from mechanical vibratory systems to high-speed optical counters utilizing photoelectric sensors, lasers, and machine vision. They are primarily used to ensure precise batch sizes for commercial seed packaging, reducing the need for the safety margins traditionally required when selling seeds by weight.

== Background ==
Before automated counting, the agricultural industry often packed seeds by weight while selling them by specific seed counts. To guarantee the advertised number of seeds and avoid under-filling, distributors had to include a safety margin of extra weight in each package. This overpacking resulted in lost product and increased expenses. The introduction of precise seed-counting machines allowed distributors to eliminate these margins, reducing product waste and overall operational costs.

== History ==
1928 United States Department of Agriculture publication regarding seed counters

Originally, seeds were counted manually or with simple trip boards. In 1929, the US Bureau of Plant Industry collaborated with seed companies to develop early mechanical counters. The first automated machines were vibratory mechanical counters. By 1962, the USDA's Agricultural Marketing Service had developed an electric seed counter that used vibration to move seeds to the edge of the machine for counting.

In the 1970s, electronic advancements introduced the "electric eye" (photoelectric sensor) to register seeds as they fell through a designated hole, though this still relied on single-file vibratory feeding.

Because single-file feeding inherently limited processing speed, the industry began developing faster bulk-counting alternatives. By the 2000s and 2010s, parallel counting technologies emerged. These newer systems allowed seeds to be placed freely on a conveyor and counted simultaneously in mid-air using multiple optical receptors and machine vision, establishing the foundation for modern high-throughput counting.

== Technology ==
Industrial seed counting relies on various sensor technologies to balance processing speed with accuracy. Early automated methods required seeds to be separated via vibration and fed in a single file past a photoelectric sensor or laser light source.

More contemporary high-speed systems utilize advanced machine vision, specifically line scan cameras. Because no singulation is needed, seeds are conveyed and counted in parallel during free fall. This bulk feeding approach operates similarly to traditional weight-based machines, but yields exact piece counts. By utilizing multiple orthogonally arranged light sources and sensor arrays, the machines capture multi-angle shadows of individual seeds in mid-air. This scanning method allows the system to accurately resolve seeds falling closely together, maximizing counting accuracy without sacrificing high throughput.

To ensure precise batch sizes and prevent overfilling, modern automated counters incorporate predictive control algorithms. Because seeds may continue to fall due to inertia after a feeding conveyor stops, these systems intentionally halt the primary continuous feed just before the target count is reached. The integrated control circuits then utilize short micro-vibration pulses to dispense the final remaining seeds, ensuring an exact batch count.

== Gallery ==
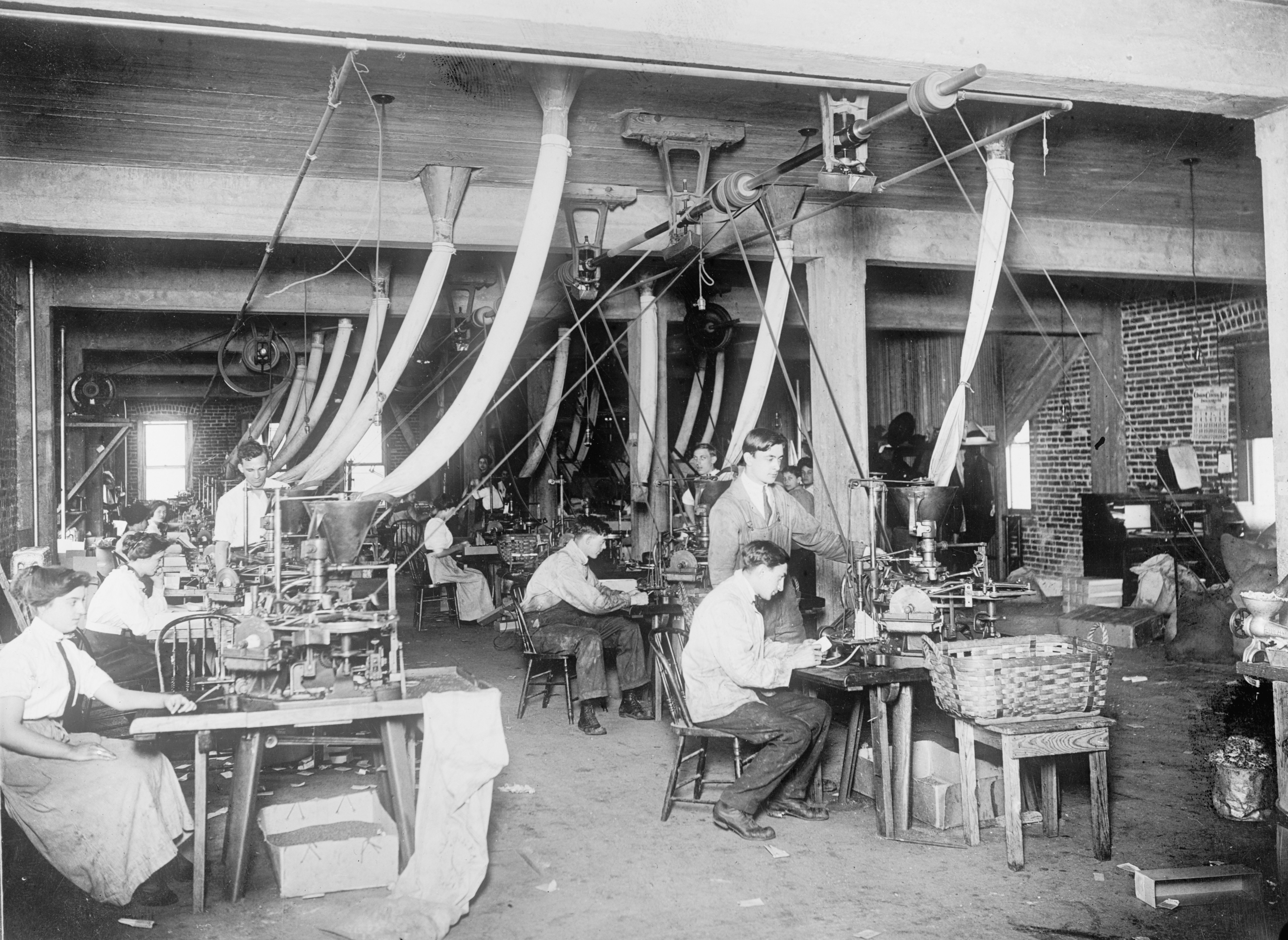
USDA seed packeting machines in operation, circa 1916

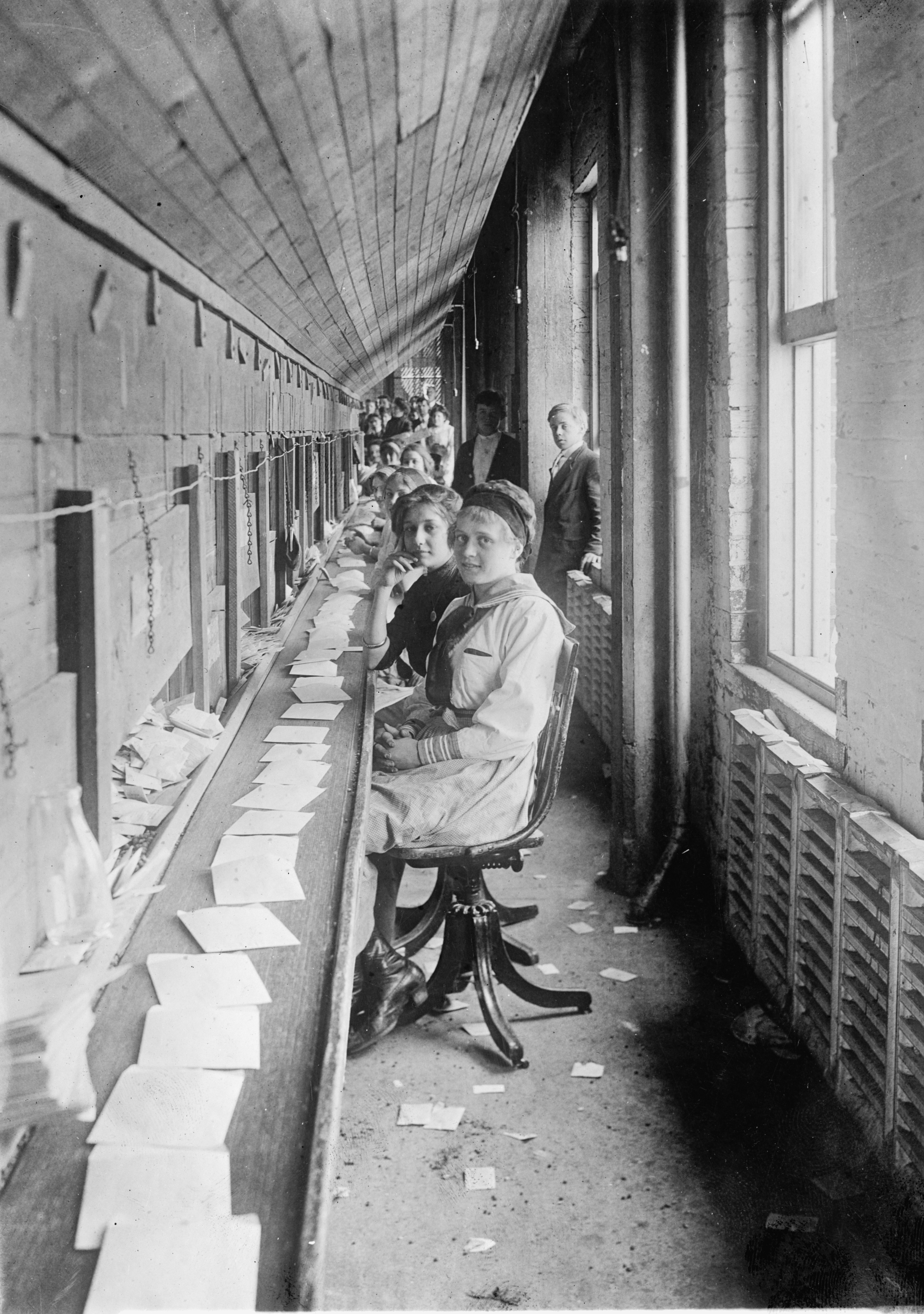
USDA seed packet assembly line, circa 1916

A seed counter at the W. Atlee Burpee company in 1943

== See also ==
- Agricultural machinery industry
- List of agricultural machinery
- Mechanised agriculture
- Seed drill (box drill, air drill)
