= Walter J. Nega =

American businessman and politician

Walter J. Nega (July 23, 1917 – December 1, 1986) was an American businessman and politician.

Born in Chicago, Illinois, Nega went to DePaul Academy. He served in the United States Army during World War II. Nega received his bachelor's from DePaul University. Nega also went to the DePaul University Law School. He was in the real estate and insurance business. Nega was involved in the Democratic Party. Nega served in the Illinois Senate from 1979 to 1983, He then served on the Illinois Pollution Control Board until his death. He died at the Michael Reese Hospital and Medical Center in Chicago, Illinois.
