= Burpee Seeds and Plants =

American seed company

W. Atlee Burpee & Co.
- Industry: Gardening
- Founded: 1876; 150 years ago
- Founder: Washington Atlee Burpee
- Headquarters: Warminster Township, Pennsylvania, U.S.
- Key people: George Ball (Chairman); Jamie Mattikow (CEO)
- Products: Seeds, plants, and supplies for home gardening
- Website: burpee.com

Burpee Seeds and Plants, officially W. Atlee Burpee & Co., is an American seed and plant company that was founded by Washington Atlee Burpee in Pennsylvania in 1876.

== History ==
=== Early years (1876–1915) ===
W. Atlee Burpee & Company was founded in 1876 by Washington Atlee Burpee in Philadelphia, Pennsylvania, after starting a mail-order chicken business in 1876. The company expanded to selling garden seeds, farm supplies, tools and hogs after customers began asking for seeds they had grown in their native farms. In 1888, the family farm, Fordhook Farm in Doylestown, Pennsylvania, was established as a family farm and crop field trials after Burpee began traveling to Europe to collect seeds which needed to be adapted to North American climates. The farm was likely the first experimental test field station in the United States. In 1900, distant cousin Luther Burbank visited the farm inspiring him to create his own experiments. He later created additional research stations, including in California in 1909, to test seeds. By the turn of the century, Burpee's had created one of the largest mail and freight businesses of the time.

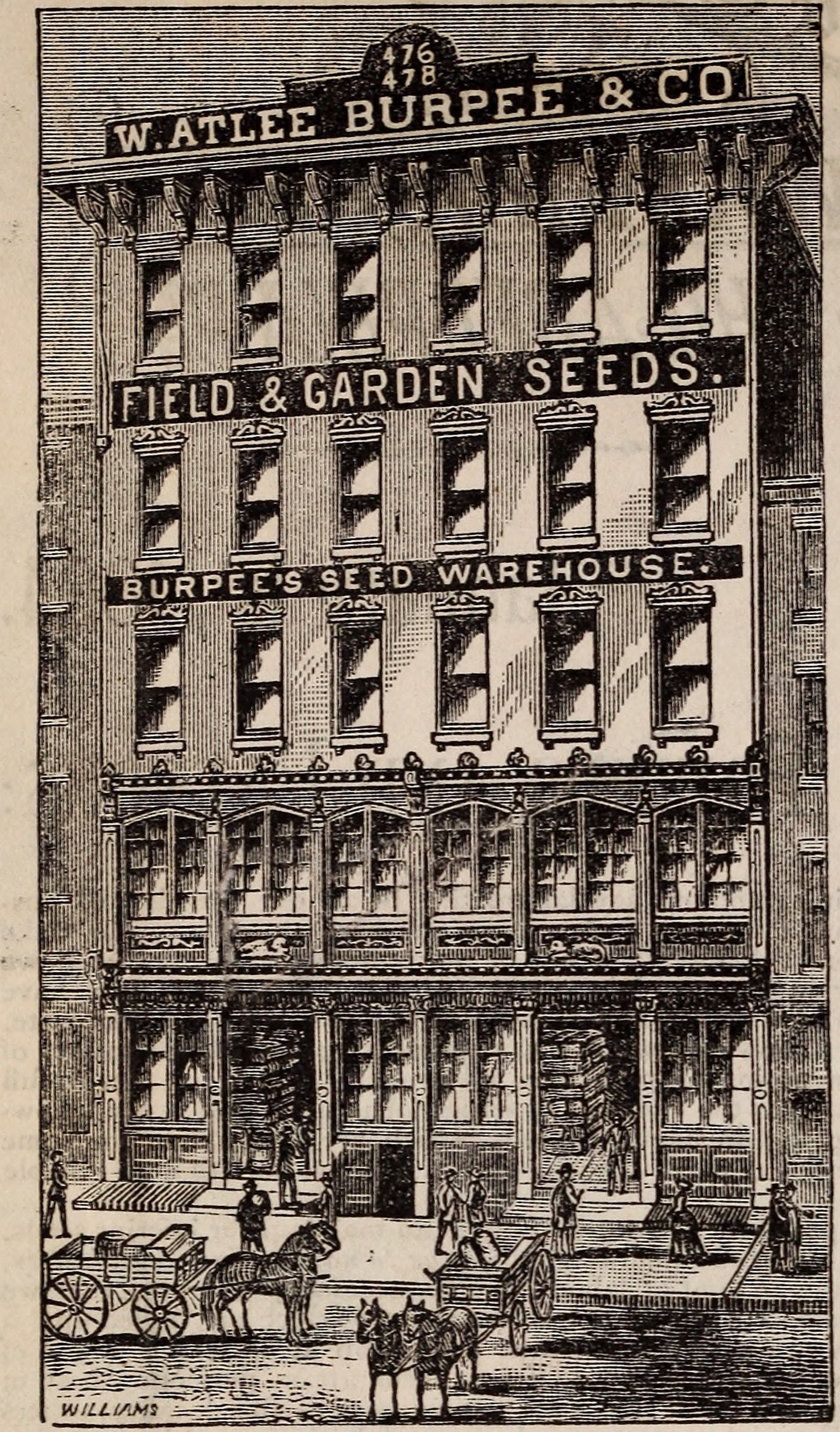
W. Atlee Burpee & Co. (1884)

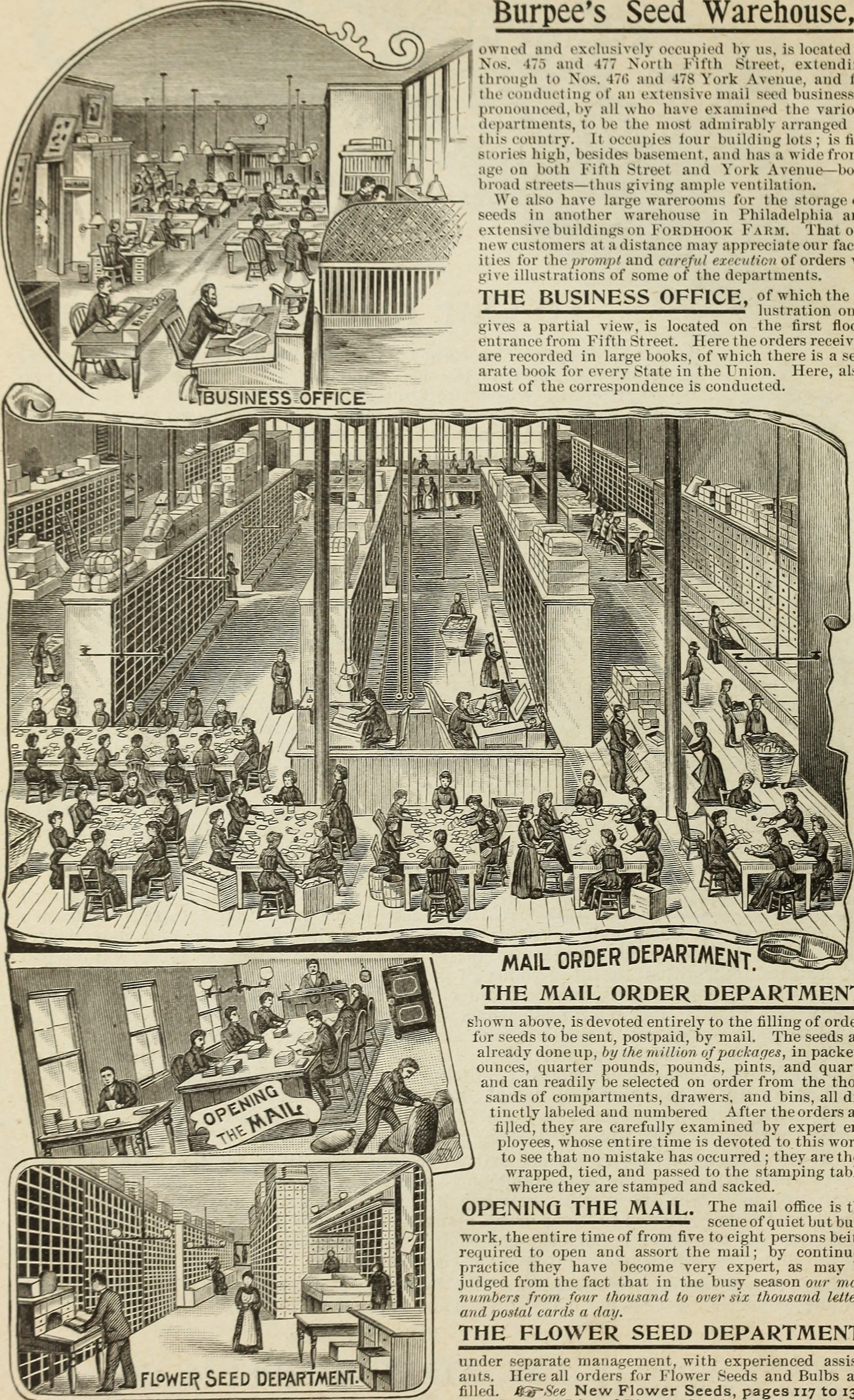
Seed warehouse operations (1893)

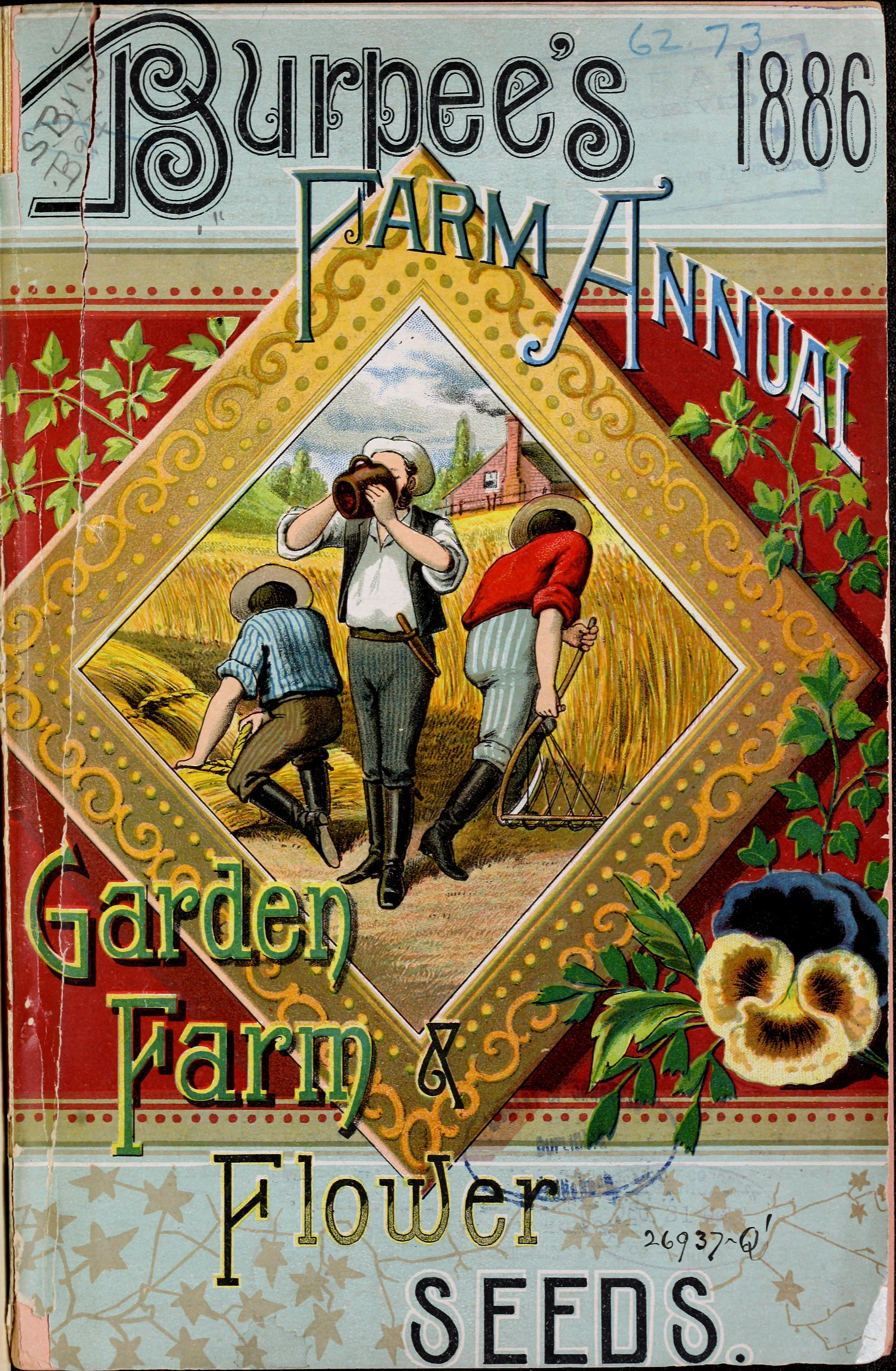
Burpee's farm annual (1886)

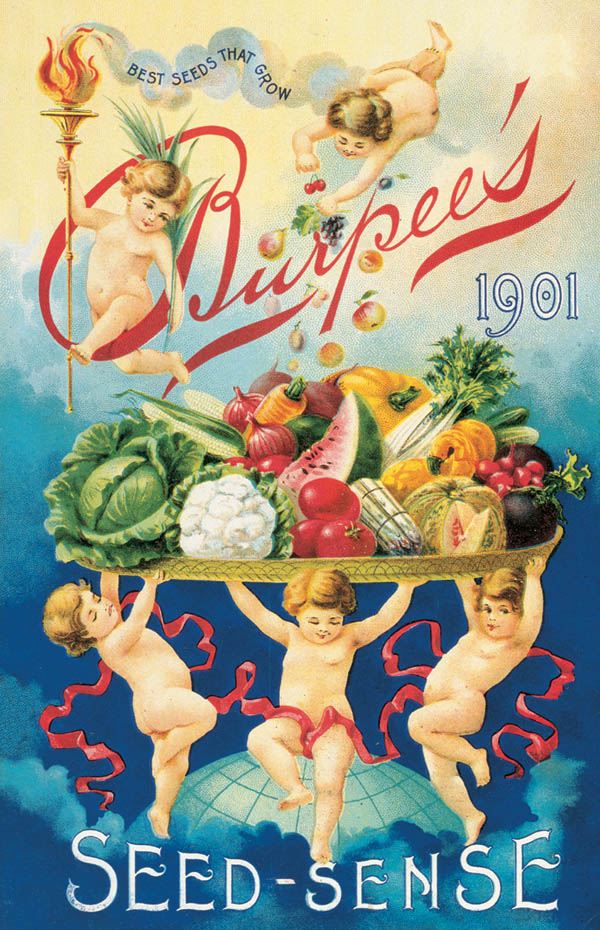
Burpee seed catalog (1901)

=== Expanding the company (1915–1970) ===
A seed-counting machine at the W. Atlee Burpee company in 1943

The direction of the company began to change with the death of its founder in 1915, when his son, David Burpee, inherited the company. David was interested in victory gardens and was an early promoter of the concept during World War I. He also prioritized flowers and initiated several flower hybridization breeding programs. Geneticists also began to modify the genes of seeds using X-rays and colchicine.

Under his leadership, the advertising and catalog also improved. The advertisements began to include full-color advertising to include Burpee's strengths of reliability of seeds using the motto "Burpee's Seeds Grow" and leader in the industry while the catalog was compact, arranged by category, and easy to find the order form. Any information not included in the catalog was sent to the customer requesting it in a handwritten letter. The catalog's sales averaged $4 per order (equivalent to $74.3 today). Various artists illustrated the catalog including Paul de Longpre and Alois Lunzer.

After Burbank's death in 1926, Burpee acquired the rights to his experiments but no notable vegetables or flowers were to come from Burbank's work. In 1949, Burpee introduced its 'Big Boy' tomato hybrid which quickly became its best seller.

=== New ownership (1970–present) ===
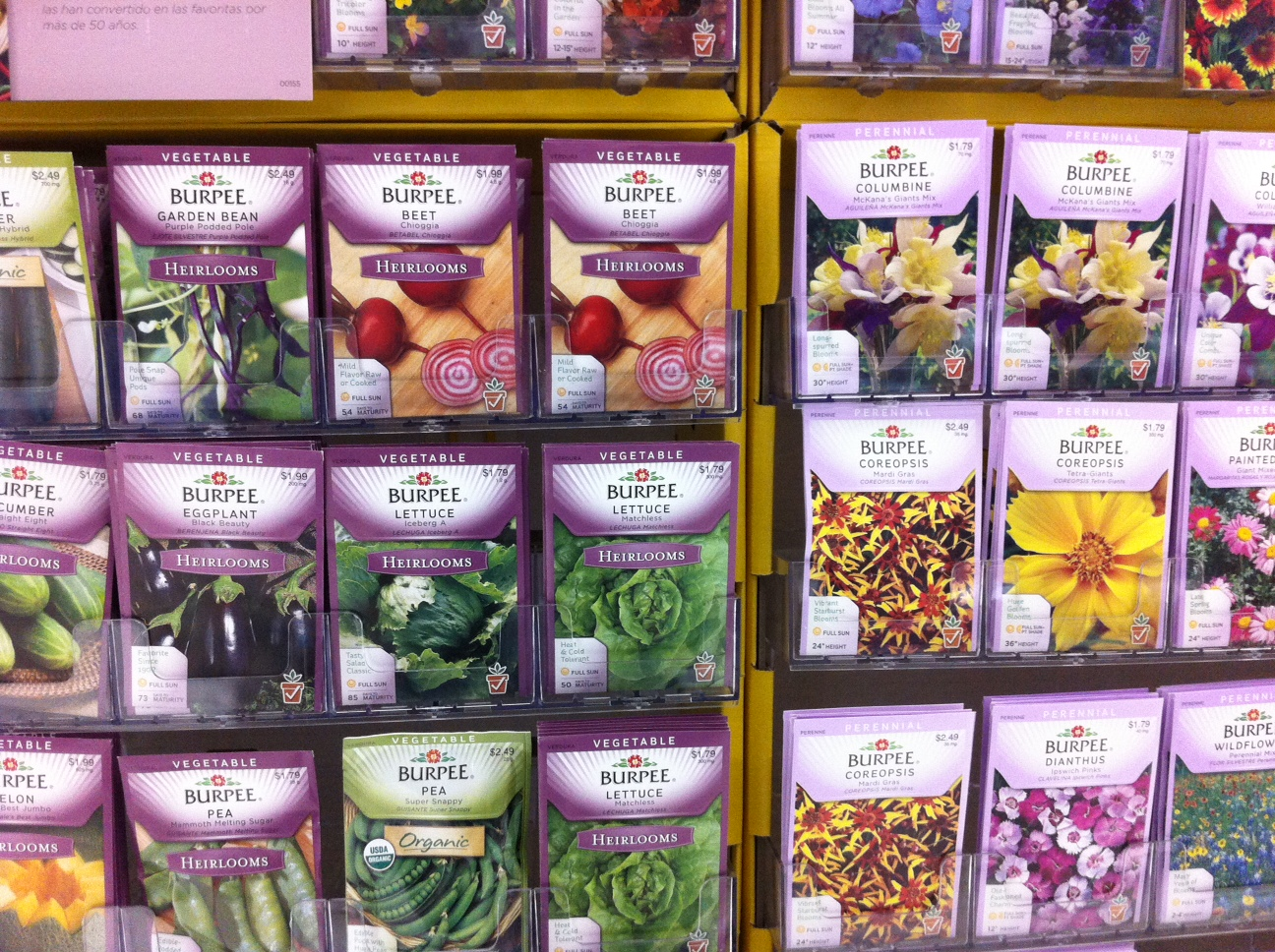
Seed packet display in store (2013)

In 1970, David Burpee sold the company to General Foods for $10 million, equal to $82,904,884 today. In 1974, Burpee moved from its north Philadelphia location to its current headquarters at 300 Park Avenue in Warminster, Pennsylvania. SEPTA extended its Warminster Line commuter rail to Warminster, the train station being opposite Park Avenue from Burpee's headquarters. In the 70s, the company introduced seed-starting kits for beginners, an innovation in the seed industry.

In 1979, the company was acquired by ITT. David Burpee remained as a consultant until his death in June 1980. In 1981, experimentation and seed production left Fordhook Farm.

In the 1980s, gardens had begun to shrink in size from an average of 600 square feet to 325 square feet while chain stores began selling a better selection of plants to their customers who preferred plants over seeds. These market changes and mismanagement by ITT led Burpee's sales to slump, and the company was purchased for $15 million by new investors McKinsey & Co. in 1987.

In 1991, the Burpee company was acquired by George Ball, Inc., a diversified horticultural family business. The new leadership diversified the business by selling new and unusual varieties; more plants than seeds; opening its own retail stores in 2000; and utilizing its web store to boost business. Jonathan Burpee, the founder's grandson, was the last Burpee family member to work for the company.

In 1998, Ball purchased the family farm, where notable varieties such as Iceberg lettuce and Big Boy tomato were bred, to renovate and establish the property as a horticultural center. The seeds Burpee produces are almost exclusively grown in California.

In March 2019, James Mattikow was named the company's president and CEO.

== White marigold ==
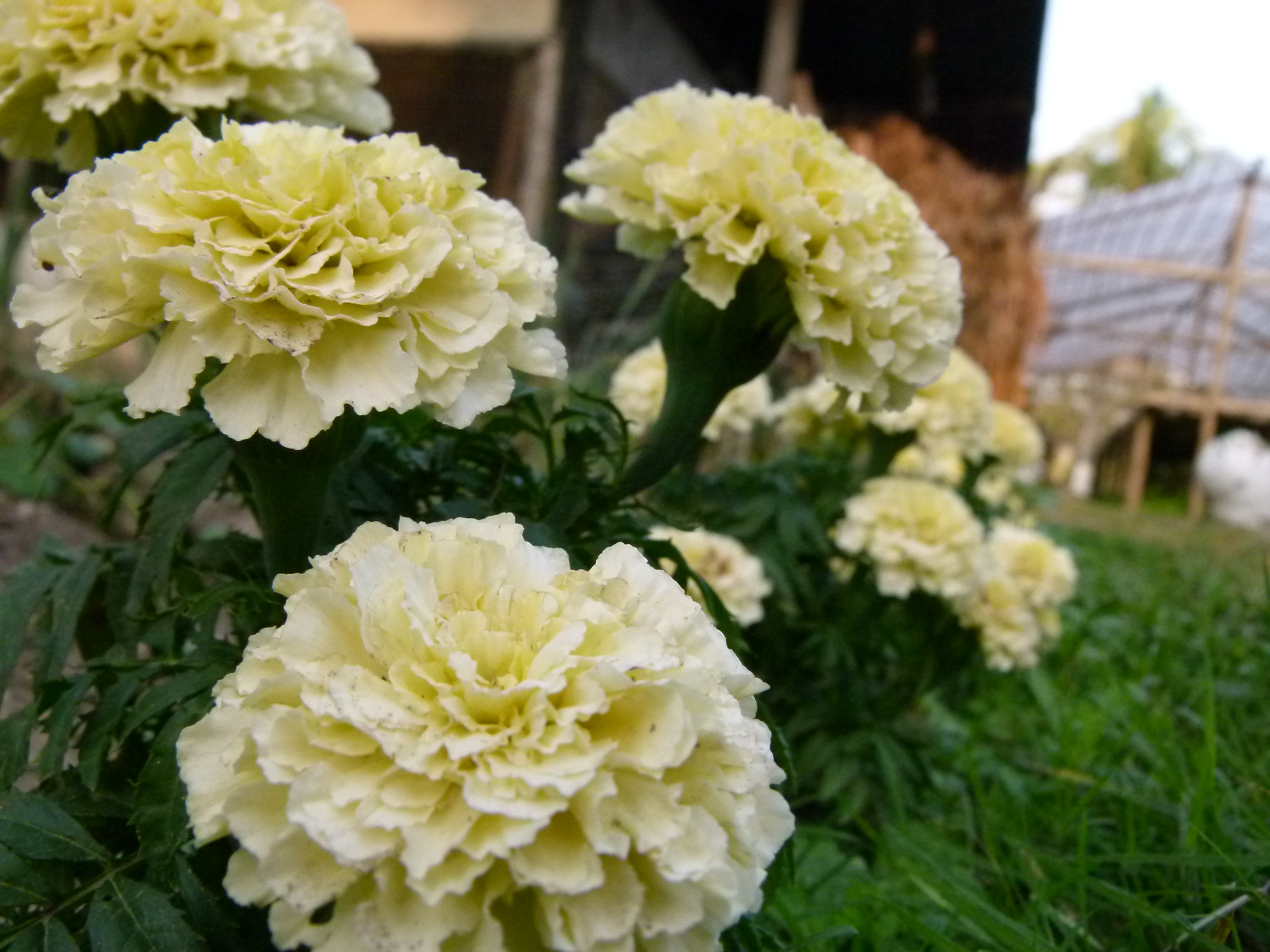
White marigold

In 1919, David Burpee began working to hybridize the marigold to overcome its limited colors, scrawniness, and late blooming flowers. It was at this time that he first had the idea of a white marigold competition but held off on it due to his belief that the hybridization would be unsuccessful.

In its 1954 catalog, W. Atlee Burpee & Co. first advertised a competition for the development of the first white marigold flower, offering $10,000 to any gardener whose efforts produced a flower deemed to be pure white. Twenty-one years later, in 1975, the prize was awarded to 67-year-old Alice Vonk of Sully, Iowa, who received $100 the previous year as one of six gardeners nationwide whose marigolds came closest to being white. Vonk kept seeds from the lightest flowers in her garden each season, replanting for over two decades before achieving a pure white marigold that measured 2.5 inches in diameter. Her entry in the 1975 edition of the contest topped 8,200 other entrants and produced what was then described as the "costliest flower ever". Burpee's branded the flower as "Burpee's Best Whites."

By 1960, the odorless flower was the best-selling flower in the United States.
