= Lily Beach =

1993 novel by Jennie Fields

- First edition
- Author: Jennie Fields
- Language: English
- Genre: Novel
- Publisher: Atheneum Books
- Publication date: 1993
- Publication place: United States
- Media type: Print (hardback and paperback)
- Pages: 304 pp (Paperback)
- ISBN: 978-0-446-67038-8
- OCLC: 29595023
- Followed by: Crossing Brooklyn Bridge

Lily Beach is a 1993 novel by the American writer Jennie Fields. It was published by Atheneum Books, and was her first published work.

== Plot ==
Lily Beach is set in the 1960s and focuses on the eponymous recent college graduate, Lily Beach, as she struggles with a past of abuse. Lily travels to Illinois and three different men to escape her past.
