= Abraham Lubin =

President of the Cantors Assembly

- Born: 1937 (age 88–89); London, England
- Education: London School of Jewish Studies; London College of Music; University of Cincinnati – College-Conservatory of Music; DePaul University; Jewish Theological Seminary of America
- Occupation: Hazzan
- Spouse: Sandy Lubin
- Children: Dr. Harlan Lubin, Stephanie Lubin, and Sharyn Lubin Levitt

Hazzan Abraham “Abe” Lubin (born 1937) is a London-born American Conservative Jewish Hazzan and former President of the Cantors Assembly, who is the cantor emeritus at Congregation Beth El in Bethesda, Maryland.

== Biography ==
=== Personal life ===
Abraham Lubin was born in London in 1937. As a child, he returned with his parents to Israel, their birthplace. In 1950, his family returned to England, where he continued his education at the Etz Chaim Yeshivah in London and then the London School of Jewish Studies (then called Jews' College) Cantorial School, where he graduated as a Hazzan. He also received the Associate of the London College of Music Diploma (A.L.C.M.) from the London College of Music, a Bachelor of Music degree from the College Conservatory of Music of the University of Cincinnati, a Master of Music degree from DePaul University, and a Doctor of Music degree from the Jewish Theological Seminary of America.

Hazzan Lubin now lives in Bethesda, Maryland. He is the father of Dr. Harlan Lubin, Stephanie Lubin, and Sharyn Lubin Levitt, and the grandfather of eight grandchildren.

=== Career ===
At age eight he sang solo with the Rivlin Choir in Jerusalem. During his school years, Hazzan Lubin sang in many leading synagogues in England and Scotland. At age thirteen, he conducted the services at leading synagogues in the area, and at age fifteen, he sang his first High Holy Day service. At seventeen he was Hazzan at the Jubilee Street Zionist Synagogue in London, and at nineteen he became Hazzan at the Bayswater Synagogue in London, where he was inducted into office by the Chief Rabbi Israel Brodie.

Lubin came to the United States in 1958, and served for ten years with the Beth Abraham Synagogue in Dayton, Ohio. Then, beginning in 1968, he served as Hazzan at Congregation Rodfei Zedek and Anshe Amet Synagogue in Chicago. And since 1990, Lubin has served at Congregation Beth El in Bethesda, Maryland. At the end of June 2011, he retired as Hazzan and became Hazzan Emeritus at Beth El.

In 1987, Hazan Lubin served on a special ten-member fact-finding committee appointed by Cantors Assembly President Saul Hammerman to explore the ramifications of allowing women to become cantors, a decision that the Assembly reached shortly thereafter. From 1995 to 1997, Lubin served as President of the Cantors Assembly.

Lubin served as editor of the Journal of Synagogue Music and contributed articles on Jewish music in various periodicals, among them “The Influence of Jewish Music and Thought in Certain Works of Leonard Bernstein.” He contributed to Mark Slobin’s 1989 book Chosen Voices: The Story of the American Cantorate. And he served on the five-member editorial committee for the 2002 edition of Siddur Sim Shalom for Weekdays.

In 1989, Lubin was one of the first two Cantors to participate in a joint project by the Cantors Assembly and the National Coalition Supporting Soviet Jewry to encourage missions of Hazzanim to travel to the Soviet Union to teach, conduct services, and to hold discussions on musical and liturgical subjects. And Lubin was one of 70 Cantors who participated in a 2009 Cantors Assembly mission, "Poland to Israel: A Journey Through Time," which included a chance meeting at a concentration camp with a group of Israeli soldiers.

In 2001 Lubin was featured on the PBS television program Religion & Ethics Newsweekly.
