= Edwin B. Bederman =

American politician (1895–1934)

Edwin B. Bederman (August 24, 1895 – October 3, 1934) was an American politician.

Bederman was born in Chicago, Illinois and went to the Chicago public schools. Bederman served in the United States Navy during World War I. He went to DePaul University and was admitted to the Illinois bar in October 1917. Bederman served in the Illinois House of Representatives from 1929 until his death in 1934. He was a Republican. Bederman died at his home in Chicago, Illinois from heart problems and a streptococcal infection.
