= Prabjot (PJ) Randhawa =

Canadian journalist

- Alma mater: DePaul University
- Occupation: Journalist
- Awards: Emmy Awards (2021)

Prabjot "PJ" Kaur Randhawa is a Canadian American investigative reporter. She is the Consumer Investigative Reporter for WMAQ NBC Chicago. Previously, Randhawa was the Investigative Race & Equity Reporter for KING5 News in Seattle, WA. Over the span of her 12-year Broadcast Journalism career, Randhawa has been the recipient of two Regional Edward R. Murrow Awards, Six Regional Emmy Awards, a 2022 DuPont nomination, a 2023 National NLJGA Award, a 2022 Crystal Mic Award for Best Reporter from the Illinois News Broadcasters Association and several other regional Journalism honors. Most notable, The city of St. Louis declared January 14, 2022 as 'PJ Randhawa Day' in honor of her many impactful investigations that advocated for St. Louisans. Prior to 2022, Randhawa was an Investigative Reporter and fill-in anchor for NBC-affiliated network television station KSDK in St. Louis, Missouri. When Randhawa started at South Dakota's KOTA-TV in 2011, this prompted headlines in Indian media celebrating her as being the "first Sikh broadcast journalist" in American television news.

== Career and awards ==
Randhawa started her news career as a News Anchor and Reporter at ABC-affiliated KOTA in Rapid City, South Dakota. In 2013, she became an investigative reporter for WIS in Columbia, South Carolina. Randhawa received the 2013 World Sikh Award for her political reporting, and the 2014 School Bell Award for reporting on education issues.

== Personal life ==
Prabhjot Kaur Randhawa was born in Winnipeg, Canada, to Sukhdev and Kuljinder Randhawa, who moved there from India in 1975. Randhawa earned a bachelor's degree in communication, media and theatre at Northeastern Illinois University and a master's degree in broadcast journalism from DePaul University in Chicago.
