= Iceberg lettuce =

Cultivar of lettuce

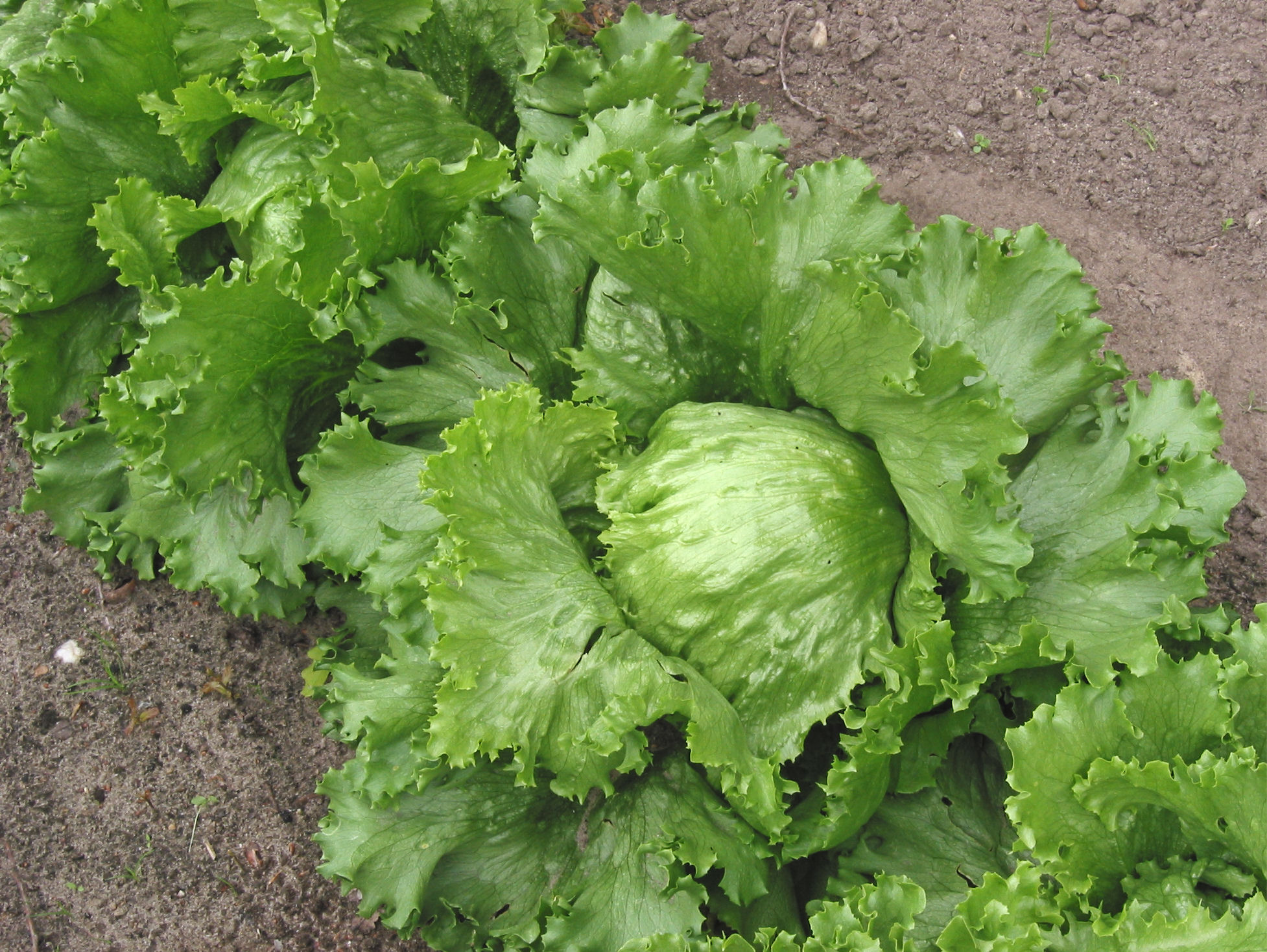
- Iceberg lettuce prior to harvesting
- Species: Lactuca sativa
- Breeder: Burpee Seeds and Plants
- Origin: United States

Iceberg lettuce, also called crisphead lettuce, is a common cultivar of lettuce. Created in 1894 in the United States by Burpee Seeds and Plants, it has since become a staple type of lettuce consumed globally.

== Name ==
The iceberg lettuce received its name from the way it was packaged for transport – the heads were once packaged on crushed ice. It is sometimes called crisphead lettuce.

== History ==
Iceberg lettuce was cultivated in 1894 by Burpee Seeds and Plants, which introduced it into their seed catalog the same year and marketed it with the slogan, "there is no handsomer or more solid cabbage lettuce in cultivation". In the United States in the early 20th-century, iceberg lettuce was grown in the summer at high altitudes in Colorado and Idaho and in spring in Arizona and the Imperial Valley of California. It quickly became the most common variety of lettuce grown in the Western United States, while the Boston Head lettuce remained the most popular in the Eastern United States. In 1922, the Sawdey-Hunt Company became the biggest buyer of the lettuce. They sold heads to hotel chains around the United States, most notably to Waldorf Astoria Hotels & Resorts. The cultivar is sought after for its mild flavor and crisp texture, and it is consumed internationally.

== Production ==
Iceberg lettuce matures faster in cooler temperatures, reaching prime age in around 60 days. It is highly sensitive to heat, and it is recommended to harvest during the coldest time of the day. Overly mature specimens have very firm and hard heads while immature ones have loose heads and are more prone to damage. It is highly perishable, and a study in Sweden found it was the third-most lost produce in retail stores. The shelf life is often shortened due to improper packaging. They are best suited to plastic wrap packaging, which lowers the risk of damage and keeps moisture out.

=== United States ===
The state of California produces iceberg lettuce all year round with its peak season in May and June and a low season in December, January, and February. In these months, the majority of the nation's supply is provided by Arizona. In 2009, California had 114,000 acres (46,000 ha) of iceberg lettuce of which the average yield was 20.7 short tons per acre (46 t/ha). Within the state, cultivation is most common in the Central Coast, South Coast, and Central Valley.

Planting the iceberg lettuce in the midsummer period results in a harvest around 70 to 80 days later. Planting in the cooler periods of late autumn and winter can result in a harvest over 130 days later. Depending on the location, iceberg lettuce has been grown in silt loam and clay soil, although the latter needs appropriate drainage. A majority of iceberg lettuce in California were planted with precision planters and pelleted seeds. Californian iceberg lettuce is typically shipped around the United States and Canada, though some smaller quantities are also shipped to Europe.

== Recall due to contamination ==
Due to high water content and raw consumption, iceberg lettuce is susceptible to pathogen contamination during harvesting and processing, with large-scale farming increasing the reach of contamination events across international supply chains. A major example occurred in July 2026, when global salad supplier Taylor Farms had to recall iceberg lettuce linked to a Cyclospora parasite outbreak causing over 1,600 illnesses, highlighting vulnerabilities in centralized agricultural production.

== Works cited ==
- Alemu, Tolcha Techane; Oanh, Vu Thi Kim (2025). "Implications of Developmental Levels and Packaging Materials on the Quality of Iceberg Lettuce for Marketing System: A Review". International Journal of Food Science. 2025 (1). doi:10.1155/ijfo/5548305. ISSN 2356-7015. PMC 11932753. PMID 40129899.
- Eriksson, Mattias; Strid, Ingrid; Hansson, Per-Anders (2012). "Food losses in six Swedish retail stores: Wastage of fruit and vegetables in relation to quantities delivered". Resources, Conservation and Recycling. 68: 14–20. doi:10.1016/j.resconrec.2012.08.001.
- "Iceberg lettuce". Chicago Tribune. July 4, 2007. Archived from the original on August 19, 2025.
- Medley, Royal John; Ellis, Catherine H. (2016). "LETTUCE AND LANDSCAPES: An Illustrated History of Arizona's Row Crops and the Art They Inspired, 1920-1960". The Journal of Arizona History. 57 (1). Arizona Historical Society: 39–60. ISSN 0021-9053. JSTOR 43865449.
- Turini, Thomas; Cahn, Michael; Cantwell, Marita; Jackson, Louise; Koike, Steve; Natwick, Eric; Smith, Richard; Subbarao, Krishna; Takele, Etaferahu (2011). Iceberg Lettuce Production in California. University of California, Agriculture and Natural Resources. doi:10.3733/ucanr.7215. ISBN 978-1-60107-762-2.
