= Sheila Radford-Hill =

American author, professor and activist

- Born: December 12, 1949 (age 75); Chicago, Illinois
- Occupation(s): Author, professor, activist
- Notable work: Further To Fly: Black Women and the Politics of Empowerment

Sheila Radford-Hill (born in Chicago, December 12, 1949) is an American author, professor, and activist. She currently works at Dominican University in Illinois as the head Diversity Officer. She is known for her book, Further To Fly: Black Women and the Politics of Empowerment published in 2000. Her book focuses in on Black Women's strenuous struggle for equality in America.

== Education ==
Radford-Hill grew up in Chicago and attended DePaul University, where she received her B.A. in English, and Secondary Education at DePaul University in 1972. She received her M.A. in American Studies and Liberal Arts and Sciences at The University of Pennsylvania in 1980. Radford-Hill went on to receive her ABD in American Studies at U of P, and her Ph.D. in Humanities at Columbia Commonwealth University in Wyoming.

== Further to Fly (book) ==
Further to Fly: Black Women and the Politics of Empowerment was published in 2000 and focuses on the importance of black feminism in the fight for equality. Radford-Hill highlights how black feminists have lost their activist roots in the thirty years prior to 2000. She explains how the fight for equality for African-Americans heavily relies on the support from the female and feminist community within. Radford-Hill argues that once black women regain their power as activists, that the economic, and social prejudice against blacks will wither. She sources this decline in activism to three things: the migration of blacks to white neighborhoods, The Moynihan Report, and the misogynistic ways of the black nationalist movement. She blames postmodern feminism for depleting the role of black women in activism because according to her research, black women were not empowered by this movement. Rather, she explains how black women were shown that the new wave of feminism was only meant for white women. Radford-Hill then goes on to explain how this gap in activism can be closed. To increase activism, she encourages black feminists to refer back to the roots of traditional feminist thought when the movement was more inclusive and empowering towards black women. She also suggests that black women need to appeal to the current social issues, engage with their community, and become more economically motivated in their activism in order to promote their activism. She explains how activists must be authentic in their work by committing to implementation of social change and research. Radford-Hill advocates for the collaboration between all feminists but overall focuses on how black women can strengthen their activism through communicating with each-other.
