= Jennie Fields =

American novelist

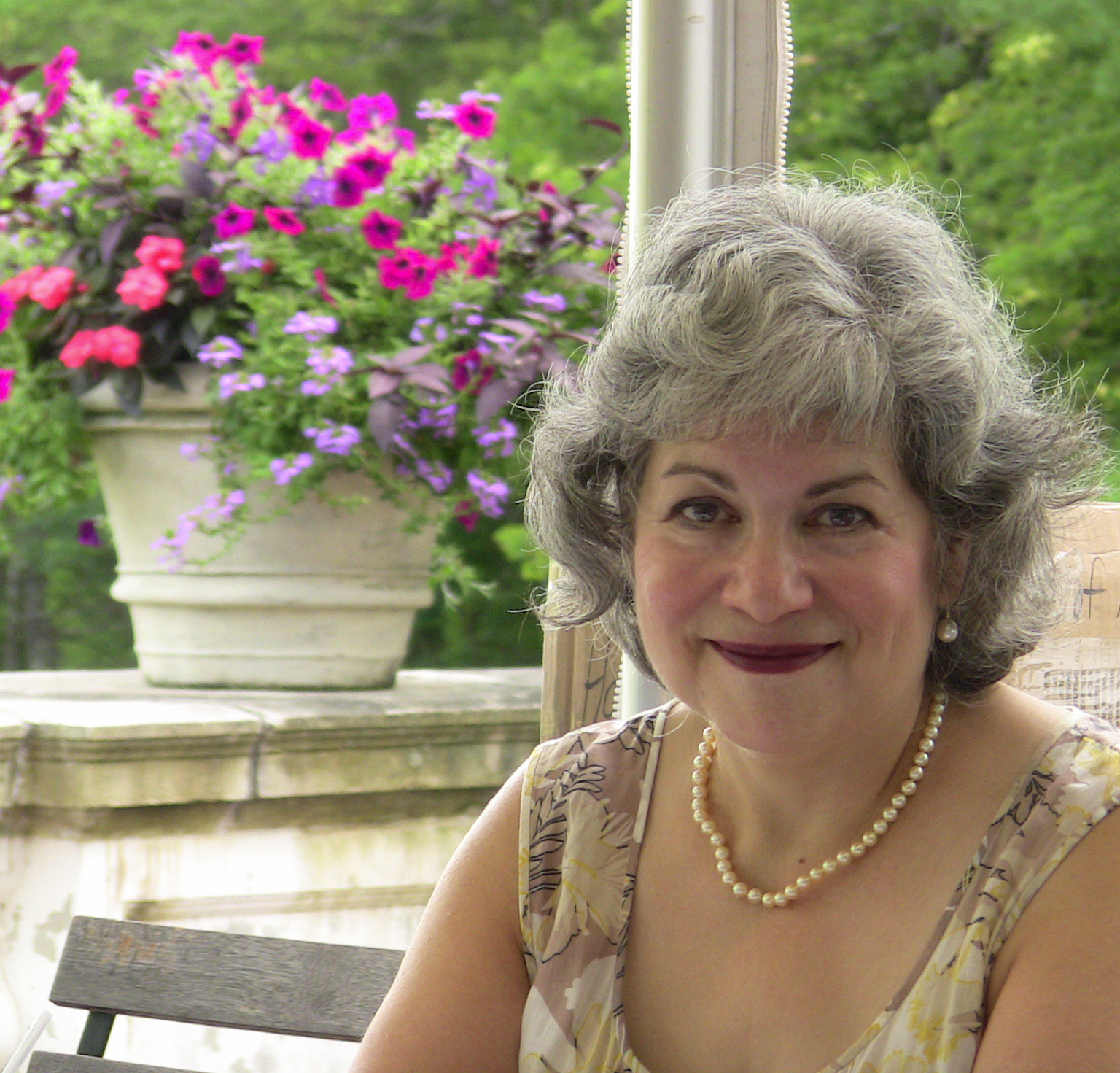
- Fields reading at The Mount
- Born: July 25, 1953 (age 73); Chicago, Illinois, U.S.
- Education: University of Illinois (BFA); Iowa Writers' Workshop (MFA)
- Occupation: Novelist
- Writing career
- Genre: Fiction
- Notable work: The Age of Desire (2012)
- Website: www.jenniefields.com

Jennie Fields (born July 25, 1953) is an American novelist. Her fourth novel, The Age of Desire, is based on the life of American writer Edith Wharton and her fifth novel, cold war thriller Atomic Love, is an international best seller and Book of the Month Club selection.

== Early life ==
Fields was born in Chicago, Illinois and was raised in Highland Park, Illinois.

Fields earned a Bachelor of Fine Arts degree in creative writing and painting from the University of Illinois and a Master of Fine Arts (MFA) from the Iowa Writers' Workshop. Fields had a successful career in advertising, starting as a copywriter in Chicago, and going on to become a creative director at several international advertising agencies in Chicago and New York. Her advertising credits include McDonald's jingles (while at DDB Needham), including "Menu Chant", which was sung by, among others, Carl Giammarese of The Buckinghams, the "We're All Connected" campaign for New York Telephone (while at Young & Rubicam), and the Lunesta Moth campaign (while at McCann Erickson) for which she won an Effie award.

Fields now lives in Nashville, TN, where she is a full-time writer.

== Novels ==
Fields has published five novels: Lily Beach, Crossing Brooklyn Ferry, The Middle Ages, The Age of Desire, and Atomic Love. Her first novel Lily Beach (Grand Central Publishing 1997), is the story of a young artist in the 1960s, struggling to find her place in a rapidly changing world. Crossing Brooklyn Ferry, (HarperCollins 1997) is the story of six people who live on the same street in Brooklyn, and what happens to them over the course of a year. Her third novel, The Middle Ages (HarperCollins 2002) tells the story of an architect who only finds the life she's really seeking when she loses her job.

== The Age of Desire ==
In 2012, Fields published The Age of Desire (Penguin Group, 2012) based on the life of American author Edith Wharton. The novel centers on Wharton's illicit affair with journalist William Morton Fullerton and that affair's effect on both her unstable husband, Edward R. "Teddy" Wharton, and her close friendship with her lifelong friend and confidant, her literary secretary Anna Bahlmann. Until recently, little had been known about Bahlmann but Fields was one of the first to have access to over 100 previously unknown letters from Wharton to Bahlmann that were auctioned in 2009. The letters are now in the collection of the Beinecke Rare Book and Manuscript Library at Yale University and form the basis of another 2012 publication, My Dear Governess: The Letters of Edith Wharton to Anna Bahlmann, edited by Irene Goldman-Price.

== Atomic Love ==
Her fifth novel, Atomic Love (Penguin Random House 2020) has been translated into ten languages and was a Book of the Month Club selection. Set in Chicago in the 1950s, it tells the story of a female physicist who worked on the Manhattan Project and who must decide whether to help the FBI by spying on a former colleague - and lover - who the FBI suspects of passing nuclear secrets to Russia. The author said inspiration came from her mother, who was a University of Chicago-trained biochemist in the 1950s.

Fields' books have been published in Argentina, Australia, Brazil, Canada, Germany, Hungary, Iran, Italy, Lithuania, the Netherlands, New Zealand, Portugal, Romania, Spain, and the UK.

== Bibliography ==
- Lily Beach (1993)
- Crossing Brooklyn Ferry (1997)
- The Middle Ages (2002)
- The Age of Desire (2012)
- Atomic Love (2020)
