= David Burpee =

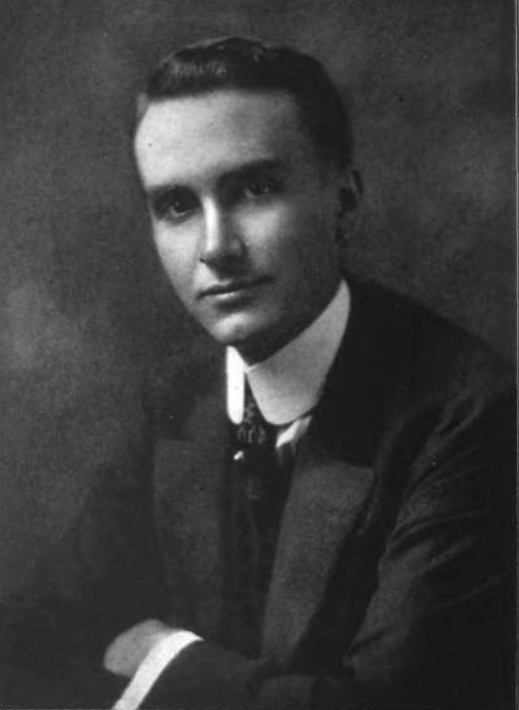
- Born: April 5, 1893; Philadelphia, Pennsylvania
- Died: June 24, 1980 (aged 87); Doylestown, Pennsylvania
- Education: Culver Military Academy
- Occupation: Seedsman
- Spouse: Lois Torrance (m. 1937)

Signature
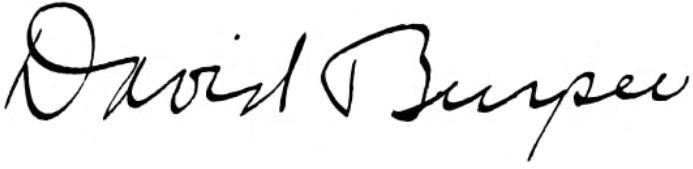

David Burpee (April 5, 1893 – June 24, 1980) was a seedsman and president of the W.A. Burpee Company from 1915 until 1970. He was known for his experimentation and hybridization of vegetables and flowers that were for the general population.

== Early life and education ==
David Burpee was born on April 5, 1893, in Philadelphia, Pennsylvania. He attended Blight School and Doylestown High School, and later Culver Military Academy in Indiana. In 1913, he enrolled in Cornell University to study agriculture until his father, W. Atlee Burpee, died in 1915. Burpee dropped out and took over the family business selling seeds.

In 1937, Burpee married Lois Torrance after meeting her at a flower show.

== Career ==
As head of Burpee Seeds, he immediately began shifting the firm's focus from vegetables to flowers. In 1917 the W. A. Burpee Company was incorporated with Burpee as president. Sales were $900,000 that year, equal to $22,616,883 today.

Burpee initiated a War Gardens campaign during World War I when overseas seed supplies were interrupted and there were food shortages. These programs were aimed at city folk, teaching them how to grow food during shortages by buying Burpee seeds. During the 1930s the company started a cross-breeding program to produce healthier and more disease-resistant hybrids. This period also saw the development of Golden Gleam, a double nasturtium, the Big Boy tomato, the Ambrosia cantaloupe, and also new varieties of petunias and marigolds.

During the 1940s Burpee moved on to genetic engineering, altering flower chromosomes using the chemical colchicine extracted from crocus plants. This research led to new varieties of snapdragons and zinnia. World War II meant more shortages and another opportunity to sell seeds in the Victory Gardens campaign.

By 1959 Burpee had grown his father's company into the largest seed catalog mail order house in the world with sales over $6 million, equal to $66,267,123 today. In 1960 Burpee mailed 4 million seed annuals to customers. By 1960, he had hybridized the marigold to be odorless and it became the best-selling flower in the United States. He later unsuccessfully lobbied to make the marigold the national flower.

In 1970, Burpee sold the company to General Foods and in 1979 it was passed on to ITT. Both companies retained David Burpee as a consultant until his death. His son Jonathan Burpee was the director of the customer service department during the 1970s. He left the company in 1993.

In 1991 the Burpee company was acquired by George J. Ball, Inc. (now Ball Horticultural Company), a diversified horticultural family business. In 1995 the family split up the various holdings, with George Ball Jr. taking control of Burpee.

Burpee died in Doylestown on June 24, 1980.
