= A. Judson Wells =

American chemist

Adoniram Judson Wells, Jr. (April 1, 1917 – February 19, 2008) was an American chemist who worked for DuPont Company for much of his career. After he retired in 1989, he began working in the field of epidemiology, and went on to publish 12 papers on the health effects of tobacco smoke, particularly passive smoking.

== Early life and education ==
Wells was born in Highland Park, Illinois, in 1917, and received both his bachelor's degree and doctorate in Chemistry from Harvard University.

== Career ==
Wells began working for DuPont in 1941, and remained there until he retired in 1989. At the time of his retirement, he was director of the industrial products division of the fabrics and finishes department. He went on to publish twelve papers on the health effects of passive smoking. These included a 1988 study estimating that 46,000 people in the United States died as a result of exposure to secondhand smoke, and a 1994 review article which concluded that passive smoking caused about 62,000 heart disease deaths in the United States per year.

== Personal life ==
Wells married Mary Gunn in August 1937; they had two sons and four daughters. He died on February 19, 2008, of a stroke at a retirement community in Kennett Square, Pennsylvania.
