= David Safran =

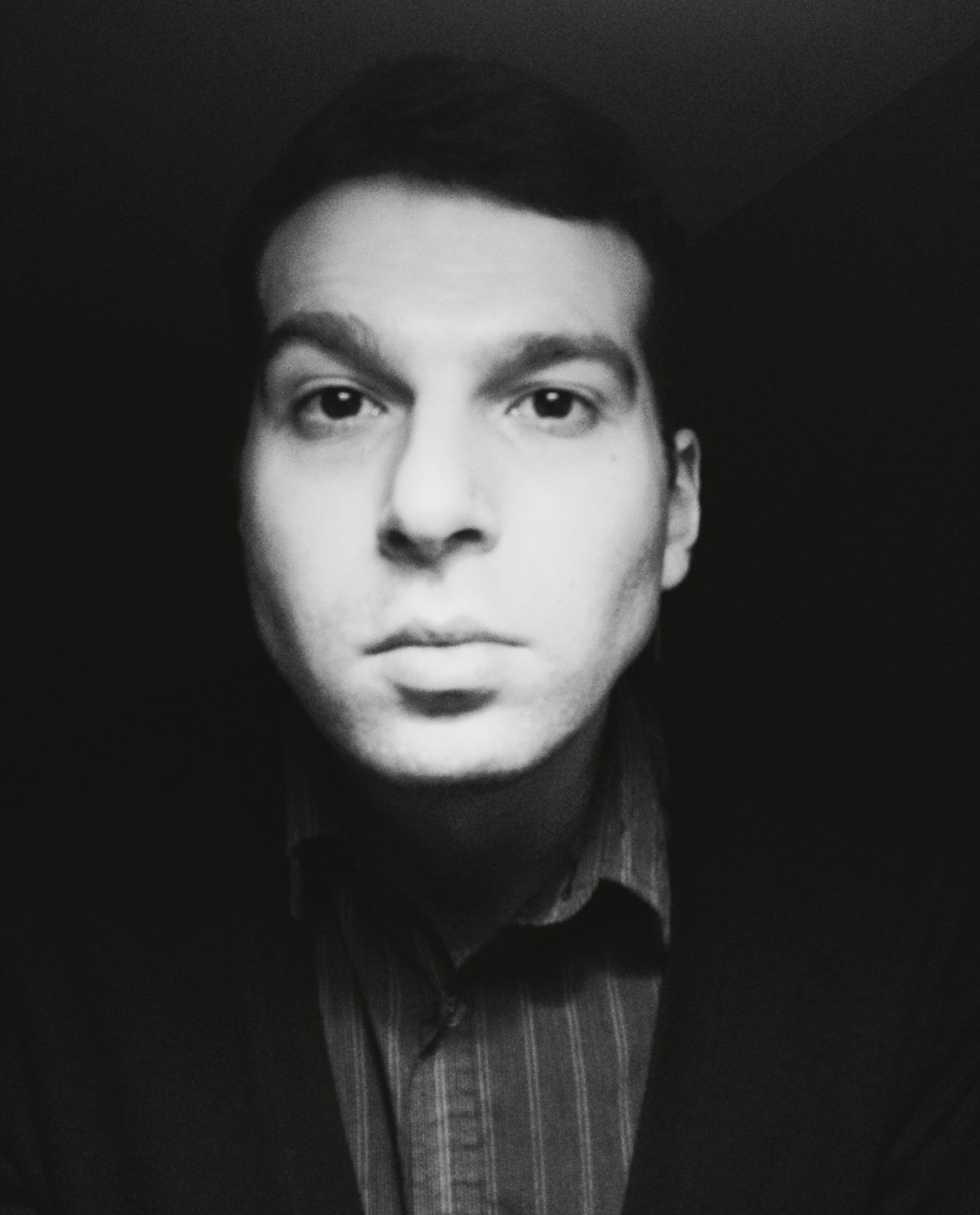
- Safran in 2018

Background information
- Born: November 22, 1983 (age 42)
- Genres: Post-punk, indie rock, indie pop, garage rock, art rock
- Occupations: Singer, songwriter, musician, writer, producer
- Instruments: Vocals, guitar, bass, piano, keyboards, drums
- Years active: 1997-present
- Formerly of: The Audreys, The Apathetics

David Safran is an American singer-songwriter, musician, essayist, producer, and investigative reporter. Active in Chicago music since adolescence, Safran is best known for his 2013 solo album Delicate Parts. Outside of music, Safran is known for his investigative articles and extensive research into CEDU facilities.

== Early life, the Apathetics (1997–1998) and the Audreys (2001–2002) ==
Born in New York, Safran was raised in Whitefish Bay, Wisconsin and Highland Park, Illinois. In middle school, Safran was introduced to the Chicago punk scene via the guitarist for ska-punk band the Eclectics who worked at the Highland Park Public Library.

In eighth grade, Safran joined melodic hardcore band the Apathetics as its permanent bass player. After the Apathetics, Safran co-founded garage rock revival band the Audreys. The band's first drummer was Patrick Stump who left for Fall Out Boy. In 2004, The Chicago Reader's Monica Kendrick wrote that the Audreys are “what the Strokes should've been." That same year, music critic Jim DeRogatis compared the Audreys to the Velvet Underground, the Stooges, and the Feelies in a Chicago Sun-Times review.

In 2009, Ivan Julian, co-founding member of Richard Hell and the Voidoids, recorded two Audreys songs for his debut solo album The Naked Flame.

== Early solo career and breakthrough singles ==
After departing the Audreys, Safran embarked on a solo career while studying English literature at DePaul University. In 2005, Safran began recording his debut full-length album after meeting Chicago producer Tim Sandusky but held it back from an official release. He also shelved follow-up recordings while continuing to perform live supporting artists such as Marc Ribot, Jorge Drexler, and Keren Ann. In a 2013 interview with WBEZ, Safran admitted to second-guessing his early music, ultimately focusing on releasing singles instead of albums.

In 2010, Safran released the song “Adult Things” featuring guitarist Andreas Kapsalis. The single eventually helped Safran find a cult audience. In 2012, Safran released “Woman Astride, Facing Away," a duet featuring indie pop singer Genevieve from Company of Thieves. Bolstered by Company of Thieves fans, “Woman Astride, Facing Away” was a regional hit.

== Delicate Parts (2013) and Newcity Magazine Controversy (2015) ==
After the breakthrough of “Woman Astride, Facing Away,” Safran assembled Delicate Parts, an LP culled from songs recorded between 2005 and 2012. Though intended to be a career-making album, Safran was unable to find a record label. Speaking in 2021 with the Buenos Aires outlet InfoNews, Safran further explained that a few labels agreed to release Delicate Parts if he changed his name and re-recorded songs in one specific genre, suggestions he declined.

In 2015, Safran contributed a controversial article for Newcity Magazine detailing unfair payment practices for local musicians at Chicago music clubs. WGN Radio host Mike Stephen said the article “rattled the local scene by exposing what life is really like playing around the city.” According to Safran, he was unofficially banned from performing at Chicago music venues as a result of the article.

== CEDU experience and "Medium Anonymous" reporting ==
As a high school freshman, Safran was sent to the private residential facility CEDU in Running Springs, California to treat misdiagnosed depression. After years of silence, Safran began an anonymous investigation exposing CEDU's five-decade history, revealing unpublished reports that the California Department of Social Services had often substantiated child abuse allegations inside the facility. In 2018, Safran posted his findings on Medium under the pseudonym “Medium Anonymous.”

In 2020, Safran pseudonymously produced The Lost Kids, a USG Audio podcast series about CEDU partly based on his written investigation. Hosted by Pulitzer and Peabody Award-winning podcast producer Josh Bloch, The Lost Kids won the Gold Award in the narrative/documentary podcast category at the 2021 New York Festivals Radio Awards. Esquire Magazine included The Lost Kids in its best true crime podcasts and it was listed in CBC's best podcasts of 2020.

After The Lost Kids, Safran revealed his identity in a short video narrated by Jen Robison, a youth rights advocate and former director of Breaking Code Silence later featured in the Max docuseries Teen Torture Inc.

TrueAnon podcast host Brace Belden called Safran "one of the best researchers into the topic...of the troubled teen industry" because of his sweeping CEDU spotlighting.

== San Bernardino Sheriff’s Department whistleblowing and Los Angeles Magazine reporting ==
In 2021, a detective at the Twin Peaks Sheriff's Station in San Bernardino asked Safran to consult on an investigation into three boys, John Inman, Blake Pursley, and Daniel Yuen, who disappeared from CEDU in 1993, 1994, and 2004 respectively. A few months into his assistance, San Bernardino County Sheriff's Department superiors halted the detective's investigation. In October 2022, Safran contributed a whistleblowing article for Los Angeles Magazine exposing how the police investigation fell apart and examining a possible cover-up.

In March 2023, Safran wrote a second investigative article for Los Angeles Magazine specifically about Daniel Yuen's 2004 unsolved disappearance from CEDU. The story revealed new details about Yuen's case and made public his problematic missing person report.

The 2025 Netflix miniseries Wayward reportedly shares many similarities with CEDU and Safran's investigations into its missing students. Safran was not involved in the production and Wayward creators have maintained the series is not based on real events.

=== Other contributions ===
- In 2013, Safran lent his voice to an Adidas commercial.
- In 2014, Safran and writer-librarian Emma Morris received an artist sponsorship from arts organization High Concept Labs to co-create a musical called The Hotwife of Hyde Park. The duo also received a grant from The Cliff Dwellers Arts Foundation to further develop their musical.
- In 2015, Safran composed the viral “3Fap” jingle for sex toy inventor Brian Sloan. Bustle described it as “the jingle of my dreams."
- In 2016, The Atlantic named "Adult Things" as its Track of the Day.
- In 2020, Safran's voice was used in the global Pandemos Project song and video “The Day After."
- In 2021, Argentina radio show Discorama aired Safran's 2010 dance-punk song “Strange Acts."
- In 2023, Safran lent his voice to a Gudang Garam commercial in Indonesia
- In 2024, Safran contributed a popular essay in the Guardian about his former day job screening digital condolence notes.
