= Washington Atlee Burpee =

Businessman

- Born: April 8, 1858; Sheffield, New Brunswick, British North America
- Died: November 26, 1915 (aged 57); Doylestown, Pennsylvania, U.S.
- Known for: Burpee Seeds
- Children: David Burpee Washington Atlee Burpee, Jr.

Signature
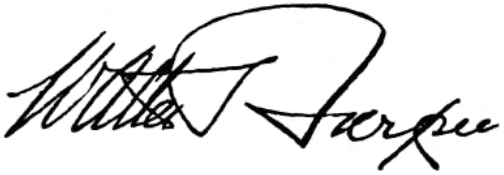

Washington Atlee Burpee (April 5, 1858 – November 26, 1915) was the founder of the W. Atlee Burpee & Company, now more commonly known as Burpee Seeds.

== Biography ==
Atlee was born in 1858 in Sheffield, Colony of New Brunswick, British North America but he moved to Philadelphia in 1861, where his father practiced medicine. His parents were David III Burpee (born 1827) and Anne Catherine Atlee (born 1834). She was the great-granddaughter of William Augustus Atlee. Both his father and grandfather were prominent in medicine and he was expected to become a doctor.

At fourteen, Atlee was already actively breeding chickens, geese, and turkeys. As a skilled breeder, he corresponded with poultry experts worldwide and wrote scholarly articles in poultry journals. He enrolled in the University of Pennsylvania Law School, dropping out after two years. In 1876, an 18-year-old Atlee started a mail-order chicken business out of the family home with $1,000 (equal to $29,528 today) loaned to him by his mother and a partner. Poultry farmers from the Northeast already knew of his talents, and he soon opened a store in Philadelphia, selling poultry and corn seed for poultry feed. It wasn't long before his customers started requesting cabbage, carrot, cauliflower, and cucumber seeds. In 1878, Burpee dropped his partner and founded W. Atlee Burpee & Company. The company soon switched to primarily garden seed, but live poultry wasn't dropped from the Burpee catalog until the 1940s.

By 1888, the family home, Fordhook Farm in Doylestown, Pennsylvania, was established as an experimental farm to test and evaluate new varieties of vegetables and flowers, and to produce seeds. Before World War I, Atlee spent many summers traveling through Europe and the United States, visiting farms and searching for the best flowers and vegetables.

Atlee shipped many of the vegetables and flowers he found to Fordhook Farms for testing. Those plants that survived were bred with healthier types to produce hybrids that were better suited to the United States. Fordhook Farms was the first laboratory to research and test seeds in this way. It specializes in testing onions, beets, carrots, peas, and cabbage.

Burpee was known for his philanthropy in regard to the poor in Philadelphia. He generously supported and sat on the board of Sunday Breakfast Rescue Mission which was one of the first homeless shelter and soup kitchens in America.

== Famous cultivars ==
In 1909, Burpee established Floradale Farms in Lompoc, California, to test sweet peas, and Sunnybrook Farms near Swedesboro, New Jersey, to test tomatoes, eggplants, peppers and squashes. In his travels, Atlee met Asa Palmer, a Pennsylvania farmer who raised beans, and who thought he had one plant that was resistant to cutworms. Burpee turned this bean plant into what is now known as the Fordhook lima bean, one of the company's most famous items.

Another successful plant was the Golden Bantam sweet corn that the farmer William Chambers of Greenfield, Massachusetts, had grown before his death. A friend of Chambers found some of the sweet corn seeds and sold Burpee seeds of the corn, and in 1902, Golden Bantam was featured in a Burpee catalog. Before 1900 most people thought that yellow corn was fit only for animals, so in order to change their customers' minds, many farmers slipped Golden Bantam corn in with the white corn they were selling. Within a few years, people in the United States were converted to yellow corn.

Iceberg lettuce was introduced by Burpee in 1894. It was named for its crispness.

== Business ==
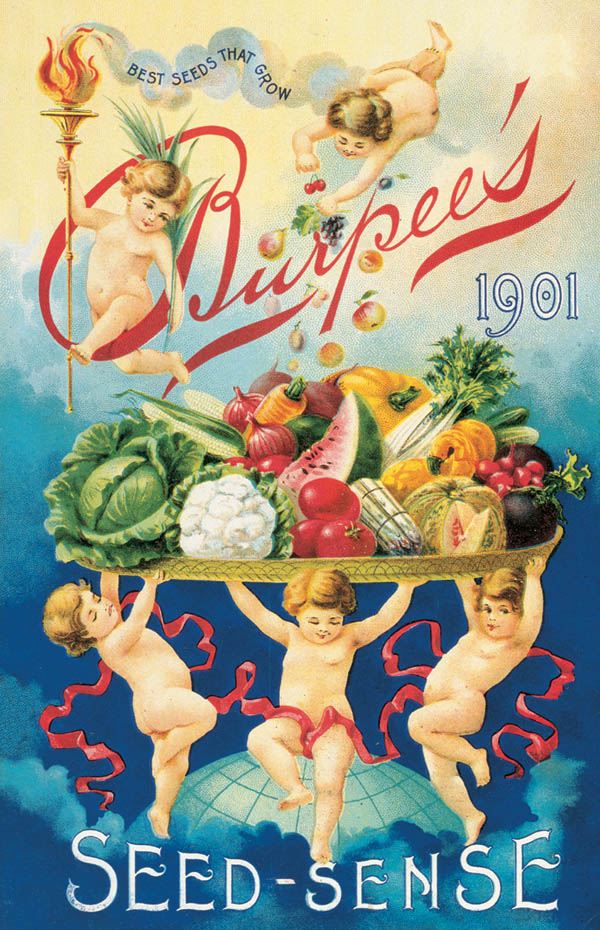
A 1901 Burpee seed catalog

A key in Burpee's business was the 1863 free delivery system that required post offices to deliver mail to residents' homes and in 1896, free delivery was extended to rural areas. This allowed his catalogs to be delivered directly to people's homes. Thousands of letters were received annually from Burpee's customers thanking him for his seeds. Burpee knew that the key to his business was advertising and the catalog was his advertising medium.

In his first year of business, his catalog was 48 pages, but by 1915 his catalogs were 200 pages and he distributed a million catalogs. Burpee personally wrote most of the copies of his catalogs. Burpee set up an advertising department and offered cash prizes for the best advertisements. This competition is what originated the slogan "Burpee Seeds Grow" in 1890. The 1891 catalog was the first to feature engravings made from photographs, and by 1901 this process was done by machines. Burpee's move to photography changed the whole industry and the hand-drawn illustrations in catalogs disappeared. In another break with tradition, Burpee eliminated cultural information and put in testimonial letters and plant descriptions.

At Burpee's death in 1915, the company had 300 employees, and it was the largest seed company in the world. At that time the Burpee company distributed over 1 million catalogs a year and received 10,000 orders a day.

== Books ==
- The Poultry Yard: How to Furnish and Manage It. A Treatise for the Amateur Poultry Breeder and Farmer on the Management of Poultry and the Merits of the Different Breeds (1895)
