= List of human-made mass poisoning incidents =

== Incidents ==
Event	Date	Type	Poison	Total est. poisoned	Est. Deaths	Place	Description
Esing Bakery incident	Jan. 15 1857	Food poisoning	Arsenic	300–500	3	Hong Kong, China	During the Second Opium War, several hundred European residents were poisoned non-lethally by arsenic, found in bread produced by a Chinese-owned store, the Esing Bakery. - It's unknown whether the contamination was deliberate or accidental.
Bradford sweets poisoning	Oct. 30 1858	Food poisoning	Arsenic trioxide	200+	21	Bradford, England	In 1858 a batch of sweets in Bradford, England, was accidentally adulterated with poisonous arsenic trioxide.
Swill milk scandal	1858	Food poisoning	N/A - Swill milk	8,000+	8,000	New York, USA	The swill milk scandal was a major adulterated food scandal in the state of New York in the 1850s. The New York Times reported an estimate that in one year, 8,000 infants died from swill milk.
English beer poisoning	1900	Food poisoning	Arsenic	6,000	70+	The Midlands and North West England	The food safety crisis was caused by arsenic entering the supply chain through impure sugar which had been made with contaminated sulphuric acid.
Elks National Home - Incident	Nov. 11 1923	Food poisoning	Arsenic	9	9	Bedford, VA, United States	Nine men were killed after drinking apple cider served in the dining room. A local farmer had produced the drink and stored it in a barrel that had been used to hold a pesticide.
Jamaica ginger - victims	1920-1930s	Food poisoning	Tri-ortho-cresyl phosphate	50,000	N/A	United States	Jamaica ginger users were afflicted with a paralysis of the hands and feet that quickly became known as Jamaica ginger paralysis or jake paralysis.
Hamaichichu Daifukumochi Incident	May. 10-11 1936	Food poisoning	Salmonella	2,072-2,296	44	Hamamatsu, Japan	After the sports day on May 10, 1936, pieces of Daifuku were distributed to students and staff containing salmonella.
Elixir Sulfanilamide - Incident	1937	Medicine contamination	Diethylene glycol	105+	105	United States	S. E. Massengill Company used diethylene glycol as the solvent for the antibacterial sulfanilamide, leading to the 1938 passage of the Federal Food, Drug, and Cosmetic Act.
SNAP-9A disintegration	1964	Poisoning	Plutonium-238	N/A	N/A	All continents	In April 1964 a SNAP-9A failed to achieve orbit and disintegrated, dispersing roughly 1 kilogram (2.2 lb) of plutonium-238 over all continents.
Nutibara bakery poisoning	1967	Food poisoning	Parathion	600+	75+	Colombia Tennessee, United States	At least 75 people died and 600 recorded intoxicated after consuming bread baked with flour that was contaminated with Parathion.
Yushō disease	1968	Food poisoning	Polychlorinated biphenyl	14,000	500+	Kyūshū, Japan	Rice bran oil contaminated with polychlorinated biphenyls in Kyūshū killed more than 500 humans and 400,000 chickens.
Iraq poison grain disaster	1971- Mar. 1972	Food poisoning	Methylmercury	459+	459+	Iraq	Imported seed grain treated with a methylmercury fungicide, never intended for human consumption, was consumed as food due to factors like foreign-language labeling.
PBB disaster	1971-1973	Food poisoning	Polybrominated biphenyl	98% of Michigan	N/A	Michigan, United States	FireMaster BP-6 were accidentally mixed with livestock feed that was distributed to farms in Michigan because the MCC plant produced another feed precursor, magnesium oxide, which was then sold on to the feed manufacturers.
Sverdlovsk anthrax leak	Apr. 2 1979	Poisoning	Bacillus anthracis	95+	68+	Sverdlovsk, Soviet Union	The causative agent of anthrax was accidentally released from a Soviet Armed Forces research facility in the city of Sverdlovsk in the Soviet Union.
Toxic oil syndrome	1981	Food poisoning	Aniline	100,000	300	Spain	Rapeseed oil intended for industrial use but had been illegally refined in an attempt to remove the aniline. It was then fraudulently sold as olive oil, mainly in street markets, mostly in the Madrid area.
Chicago Tylenol murders	1982	Medicine contamination	Potassium cyanide	7+	7+	Chicago, United States	Tylenol contaminated with potassium cyanide. The incidents led to reforms in the packaging of over-the-counter drugs and to federal anti-tampering laws.
Bhopal disaster	Dec. 3 1984	Poisoning	Methyl isocyanate, hydrogen cyanide, mono methyl amine	574,366+	3,787-8,000+	Bhopal, India	Poor maintenance and disregard for safety systems resulted in what is considered the world's worst industrial disaster.
Camelford water pollution incident	1988	Poisoning	Aluminium sulphate	30,000	0, but lead to an estimated 20+ later deaths	Camelford, Cornwall, England	Relief tanker driver working for ISC Chemicals accidentally poured the load of 20 tonnes of aluminium sulphate into the tank, which held treated water for consumers in Camelford.
Delhi oil poisoning	1998	Food poisoning	N/A - Adulterans	3,000	60	Delhi, India	Adulterated mustard oil resulted in 60 deaths and more than 3,000 poisoned.
Chinese milk scandal	2008	Food poisoning	Melamine	294,000	6	China	Sanlu Group's milk and infant formula along with other food materials and components being adulterated with the chemical melamine.
Zamfara State lead poisoning outbreak	2010	Poisoning	Lead	355	163	Zamfara State, Nigeria	The BBC suggested the contamination of water may have contributed to the high mortality rate. Or it is thought illegal extraction of ore led to hand-to-mouth contamination of lead.
Flint water crisis	2014-2019	Food poisoning	Lead and possibly Legionella bacteria.	100,000	12	Flint, Michigan, United States	Officials failed to apply corrosion inhibitors to the water, which resulted in lead from aging pipes leaching into the water supply. 12 fatalities due to legionella.
Punjab sweet poisoning	2016	Food poisoning	Chlorfenapyr	50+	33	District Layyah, Punjab, Pakistan	A sweet shop owner, Khalid Mahmood, confessed to mixing the pesticide chlorfenapyr into the sweets after an argument with his brother and co-owner.
Tribistovo poisoning	Jan. 1 2021	Poisoning	Carbon monoxide	8	8	Tribistovo, Bosnia and Herzegovina	Four boys and four girls – were found dead in a holiday cottage after a New Year's Eve celebration. Died due to carbon monoxide poisoning, instigated by a power generator used to heat the cottage.
Iranian schoolgirls mass poisoning reports	2022	Poisoning	Unknown	Thousands	N/A	Iran	A series of chemical attacks during which students in dozens of schools in Iran were reportedly poisoned in various and undetermined manners by unidentified perpetrators.
Laos methanol poisoning	Nov. 13 2024	Food poisoning	Methanol	14+	6	Vang Vieng, Laos	Authorities linked the poisoning to the illicit production of alcohol containing methanol, a toxic substance.
Gudauri carbon monoxide poisoning	Dec. 14 2024	Poisoning	Carbon monoxide	12	12	Gudauri, Georgia	12 restaurant workers died due to carbon monoxide poisoning after heating lodgings with fuel oil generators.

- 1857, Hong Kong. Esing Bakery incident: 300–500 people consumed bread adulterated with large quantities of arsenic. Only three deaths were recorded, since the amount of arsenic was high enough to induce vomiting and prevent digestion. It is unknown whether the contamination was deliberate or accidental.
- 1858, England. Bradford sweets poisoning: Sweets accidentally made with arsenic were sold from a market stall which led to the poisoning of more than 200 people, including 21 deaths.
- 1858, United States. In the New York Swill milk scandal, an estimated 8,000 infants died in just one year, during the years long duration of adulterated milk.
- 1900, English beer poisoning, more than 6,000 people in England were poisoned by arsenic-tainted beer, with more than 70 of the affected dying as a result.
- 1923, Elks National Home in Bedford, Virginia. Nine killed by apple cider contaminated by a pesticide.
- 1930, United States. Jake Leg poisoning. A large number of users of Jamaica ginger were afflicted with a paralysis of the hands and feet that quickly became known as Jamaica ginger paralysis or jake paralysis.
- 1936, Japan. On 11 May, 2,072 people were afflicted, resulting in 47 deaths. It was one of the largest single poisoning incidents in Japan, caused by salmonella, but no investigation of the confectionery shop by local officials ever occurred according to the Japanese government.
- 1937, United States. Elixir Sulfanilamide disaster - 105 adults and children died from diethylene glycol in over 14 states from a toxic version of sulfanilamide created by the S.E Massengill's company marked as the 'Elixir of sulfanilamide.'
- 1964, The whole planet earth. A satellite called SNAP9a with 1 kilogram (2.2 lb) of plutonium-238 exploded and was distributed over all continents.
- 1967, Colombia. Nutibara bakery poisoning: At least 75 people died and 600 recorded intoxicated after consuming bread baked with flour that was contaminated when bottles containing Parathion, a potent insecticide spilled over the flour bags during transit.
- 1968, Japan. Yushō disease; mass poisoning resulting from rice bran oil contaminated with polychlorinated biphenyls in Kyūshū affected 14,000 and killed more than 500 humans and 400,000 chickens.
- 1971, Iraq. Iraq poison grain disaster: A mass poisoning by grain treated with a methylmercury fungicide which was imported to the country as seed and never intended for human consumption. According to several estimates, the recorded death toll varies from 459 to 650 people, though much higher estimates have been offered.
- 1973, United States. Michigan cattle poisoning with PBB: A fire retardant chemical polybrominated biphenyl (PBB) was accidentally mixed in with cattle feed and consumed by over 30,000 dairy cows. An estimated 98% of citizens of Michigan state was poisoned through ingestion of beef, dairy products along with other animals and their products.
- 1979, Soviet Union. Sverdlovsk anthrax leak in which spores of Bacillus anthracis (the causative agent of anthrax) were accidentally released from a Soviet military research facility in the city of Sverdlovsk, (now Yekaterinburg, Russia), leading to deaths of at least 68 people.
- 1981, Spain. An outbreak of Toxic oil syndrome supposedly caused by contaminated colza oil. About 100,000 individuals were exposed and clinical disease occurred in 20,000 people, 10,000 of whom were hospitalized, more than 300 victims died and many more were left with chronic disease.
- 1982, United States. The Chicago Tylenol murders, an unsolved case of drug tampering in the Chicago area. Seven deaths were linked to the potassium cyanide poisoning, leading to a nationwide recall of Tylenol products.
- 1984, India. The Bhopal disaster (also known as Bhopal gas tragedy): A gas leak incident which led to at least 3,787 deaths.
- 1988, England. Camelford water pollution incident: The accidental contamination of the drinking water supply to 20,000 local people and up to 10,000 tourists, with 20 tonnes of aluminium sulphate. Officially, there were no deaths caused by the accident. But 60,000 salmon and trout were killed.
- 1998, Delhi oil poisoning, adulterated mustard oil resulted in 60 deaths and more than 3000 poisoned.
- 2008, Chinese milk scandal. Milk and infant formula along with other food materials and components were adulterated with melamine. An estimated 294,000 victims; six children died from kidney stones and other kidney damage.
- 2010, Nigeria. A series of lead poisonings in Zamfara State led to the deaths of at least 163 people.
- 2014, Flint water crisis. Over 100,000 residents of Flint, Michigan exposed to elevated lead levels in the water supply, including up to 12,000 children, resulting in brain damage to many of the children. And 12 died due to legionella.
- 2016, Pakistan. Punjab sweet poisoning: 50 poisoned with at least 33 people, including five children, died after eating purposely poisoned laddu, a baked confection.Testing of the confectioneries revealed they were laced with the highly toxic insecticide chlorfenapyr.
- 2021, Bosnia and Herzegovina. Tribistovo poisoning: A carbon monoxide leak from a power generator led to the deaths of eight teenagers.
- 2023, Iran. Iranian schoolgirls mass poisoning reports. A series of chemical attacks during which students in dozens of schools in Iran were reportedly poisoned in various and undetermined manners by unidentified perpetrators. Reports of thousands of students being poisoned.
- 2024 Laos methanol poisoning, 6 died and at least 8 others was poisoned due to illicit production of alcohol containing methanol.
- 2024, Georgia. Gudauri carbon monoxide poisoning: 12 died from poisoning after a storm in Gudauri caused a power outage a day prior making employees heat lodgings with electric generators using fuel oil. Fumes from the generator caused carbon monoxide poisoning.

== See also ==
- List of food contamination incidents
- List of foodborne illness outbreaks
- List of medicine contamination incidents
