= List of food contamination incidents =

Food may be accidentally or deliberately contaminated by microbiological, chemical or physical hazards. In contrast to microbiologically caused foodborne illness, the link between exposure and effect of chemical hazards in foods is usually complicated by cumulative low doses and the delay between exposure and the onset of symptoms. Chemical hazards include environmental contaminants, food ingredients (such as iodine), heavy metals, mycotoxins, natural toxins, improper storage, processing contaminants, and veterinary medicines. Incidents have occurred because of poor harvesting or storage of grain, use of banned veterinary products, industrial discharges, human error and deliberate adulteration and fraud.

== Definition of an incident ==
An "incident" of chemical food contamination may be defined as an episodic occurrence of adverse health effects in humans (or animals that might be consumed by humans) following high exposure to particular chemicals, or instances where episodically high concentrations of chemical hazards were detected in the food chain and traced back to a particular event.

== Socio-economic impacts ==
Information on the impacts of these incidents is fragmentary and unsystematic, ranging from thousands of dollars to meet the cost of monitoring analysis, to many millions of dollars due to court prosecutions, bankruptcy, product disposal, compensation for revenue loss, damage to brand or reputation, or loss of life.

== List of notable incidents ==
=== Ancient times ===
- Roman Empire – There is speculation that the Romans, in particular the elite, suffered severe chronic lead poisoning due to the ubiquity of lead in e.g. lined pots in which acidic foodstuffs were boiled, over and above any exposure to lead in water pipes. They also used sugar of lead to sweeten their wines.

=== Middle Ages ===
- Europe – Numerous incidents of human poisoning due to the consumption of rye bread made from grain infected with ergot fungi.

=== Early modern period ===
- England and France - In the 17th century, lead contamination in cider led to a condition called Devon colic in England and Poitou colic in France. The precise cause, extensive use of lead in the cidermaking process, was not discovered until the 1760s.

=== 19th century ===
- 1850s – Swill milk scandal in New York.
- 1857 – Adulteration of bread with alum in London, causing rickets.
- 1857 – Esing Bakery incident: poisoning of bread with arsenic in Hong Kong targeting the colonial community.
- 1858 – Sweets poisoned with arsenic in Bradford, England.

=== 1900 to 1949 ===
- 1900 – 1900 English beer poisoning – Beer contaminated with arsenic. Traced to sugar manufactured with sulfuric acid that was naturally contaminated with arsenic from Spanish pyrites. An epidemic of 6,070 cases in London, including 70 deaths.
- 1910–45 – Cadmium from mining waste contaminated rice irrigation water in Japan. The illness, known as itai-itai disease, affected more than 20% of women aged over 50 years.
- 1920 – In South Africa, 80 people suffered poisoning from eating bread contaminated with naturally occurring pyrrolizidine alkaloids.
- 1900s–49 – Agene process; Severe and widespread neurological disorders due to bread flour bleached with agene, a process no longer in use. The denatured protein in the treated flour is toxic and causes a condition of hysteria in dogs eating biscuits made from the flour.
- 1930s – An epidemic of OPIDN organophosphate poisoning occurred during the 1930s Prohibition Era. Thousands of men in the American South and Midwest developed arm and leg weakness and pain after drinking a "medicinal" alcohol substitute called "Ginger Jake". The substance contained an adulterated Jamaican ginger extract, which was contaminated with tri-ortho-cresyl phosphate (TOCP). The contamination resulted in partially reversible neurologic damage. The damage resulted in the limping "Jake Leg" or "Jake Walk", which were terms frequently used in the blues music of the period. Europe experienced outbreaks of TOCP poisoning from contaminated abortifacients. Morocco experienced outbreaks of TOCP poisoning from contaminated cooking oil.
- 1942 – Prisoners at the Vapniarka concentration camp, in present day Ukraine, were fed a diet containing significant quantities of Lathyrus sativus, a species of pea that was normally used to feed livestock. A team of doctors among the inmates, led by Dr. Arthur Kessler of Cernăuţi, reached the conclusion that the disease presented all the symptoms of lathyrism, a spastic paralysis caused by the oxalyldiaminopropionic acid present in the pea fodder. Within a few weeks, the first symptoms of the disease appeared, affecting the bone marrow of prisoners and causing paralysis. By January 1943, hundreds of prisoners were suffering from lathyrism.
- 1942 – On November 18, inmates and employees at Oregon State Hospital were served scrambled eggs into which sodium fluoride, used by the hospital as an insecticide to control cockroaches, had accidentally been mixed. Subsequent investigation concluded that another inmate, while assisting cooks at the asylum, confused the insecticide with powdered milk that was similarly colored and stored in the same location. 467 people became violently ill shortly after consuming the poison-contaminated food, and 47 subsequently died from its effects.

=== 1950 to 2000 ===
- 1951 – 1951 Pont-Saint-Esprit mass poisoning in France, probably caused by ergot.
- 1950s – Minamata disease: Mercury poisoning in fish in Japan, contaminated by industrial discharge. By 2010 more than 14,000 victims had received financial compensation.
- 1955 – Morinaga Milk arsenic poisoning incident: Arsenic in milk powder in Japan. An industrial grade of monosodium phosphate additive which inadvertently contained 5–8% arsenic, was added to milk fed to infants. Over 600 died, and over 6,000 people suffered health effects such as severe intellectual disability. Those health effects have continued in the remaining survivors today.
- 1956 — Bread made from flour inadvertently contaminated with eldrin (an insecticide) caused serious illness in 49 people in the Welsh town of Pontardawe.
- 1957 – In the United States, millions of chickens died after eating dioxin-contaminated feed, and 300,000 more were killed to prevent consumption. It was later discovered that the feed was made with contaminated tallow, eventually traced to the use of trimmings from pentachlorophenol-treated cow hides at rendering plants.
- 1959 – Moroccan oil poisoning disaster: several thousand people in Meknes suffer flaccid paralysis caused by deliberate contamination of cooking oil with jet engine lubricating oil containing tricresyl phosphate got as surplus from a US airbase at Nouaceur.
- 1965 – Epping jaundice outbreak: 84 people became ill due to accidental contamination of flour with 4,4'-methylenedianiline (a curing agent for epoxy resin) in Epping, Essex, United Kingdom.
- 1968 – Yushō disease: mass poisoning resulting from rice bran oil contaminated with polychlorinated biphenyls in Kyūshū, Japan.
- 1971 – 1971 Iraq poison grain disaster: 100 to 400 died of mercury poisoning by eating seeds intended for planting and treated with mercury as a fungicide.
- 1973 – Michigan PBB contamination incident: Widespread poisoning of people in Michigan by meat from cattle fed feed contaminated with polybrominated biphenyl flame retardant.
- 1974–1976 – Afghanistan: widespread poisoning (an estimated 7800 people affected with hepatic veno-occlusive disease (liver damage) and about 1600 deaths) was attributed to wheat contaminated with weed seeds known as charmac (Heliotropium popovii. H Riedl) that contain pyrrolizidine alkaloids.
- 1976 – Seveso dioxin contamination in Italy.
- 1979 – In central Taiwan, Over 2,000 individuals were affected by dioxin-contaminated cooking oil in what came to be called Yu-Cheng.
- 1981 – Spanish toxic oil syndrome. Thousands permanently damaged by eating industrial colza oil denatured with aniline and sold as olive oil. There was strong suspicion that the cause was in fact insecticide in Spanish tomatoes, and that official agencies actively supported the contaminated oil position, suppressing evidence contradicting it.
- 1984 – Rajneeshee bioterror attack: Cult members of a small town in Oregon spiked the salad bars of ten local restaurants with salmonella in an attempt to incapacitate voters ahead of an upcoming election. About 750 people contracted salmonellosis.
- 1984/85 – "Hamburger thyrotoxicosis" among residents of southwestern Minnesota and adjacent areas of South Dakota and Iowa.
- 1985 – Aldicarb pesticide residue present in watermelons grown in California caused an outbreak of pesticide food poisoning which affected over 2,000 people, and lead to a temporary ban on watermelon sales.
- 1985 – Adulteration of Austrian wines with diethylene glycol.
- 1986 – Adulteration of Italian wines with ethylene glycol killed more than 18 people.
- 1987 – Beech-Nut Nutrition Corporation paid $2.2 million, then the largest fine issued, for violating the Federal Food, Drug, and Cosmetic Act by selling artificially flavored sugar water as apple juice. John F. Lavery, the company's vice president for operations was convicted in criminal court and sentenced to a year and a day in jail; Niels L. Hoyvald, the president of the company, also convicted, served six months of community service. Each of them also paid a $100,000 fine.
- 1989 – Milk contamination with dioxins in Belgium.
- 1993 – Jack in the Box E. coli outbreak: Escherichia coli O157:H7 bacterium originating from contaminated beef patties killed four children and infected 732 people across four states in the United States.
- 1994 – Ground paprika in Hungary was found to be adulterated with lead oxide, causing deaths of several people, while dozens of others became sick.
- 1996 – Odwalla E. coli outbreak: Apple juice made using blemished fruit contaminated with E. coli bacterium, which ultimately killed one and sickened 66 people.
- 1996 – Japan E. coli O157:H7 outbreak in Osaka, Japan schools, with over 7,000 students affected. Linked to white radish sprouts.
- 1996 – Wishaw, Scotland E. coli outbreak. Butchers John M. Barr & Son sold contaminated meat products to several events. Deadliest outbreak of the 0157 strain, with 21 people killed.
- 1998 – Delhi oil poisoning. In New Delhi, India, edible mustard oil adulterated with Argemone mexicana seed oil caused epidemic dropsy in thousands of people, because Argemone mexicana seed oil contains the toxic alkaloids sanguinarine and dihydrosanguinarine. Over 60 people died and more than 3,000 were hospitalized in the 1998 incident. Similar incidents have occurred in India since that time: in 2000 at Gwalior, in 2002 at Kannauj, and in 2005 at Lucknow.
- 1998 – In Germany and the Netherlands, meat and milk were found with elevated dioxin concentrations. The dioxin was traced to citrus pulp from Brazil that had been neutralized with lime contaminated with dioxins. 92,000 tons of citrus pulp were discarded. The citrus pulp market collapsed in some European countries. A tolerance level for dioxins in citrus pulp was set by the European Commission.
- 1999 – In Belgium, animal feed contaminated with dioxins and polychlorinated biphenyls affected more than 2,500 poultry and pig farms. This incident led to the formation of the Belgium Federal Food Safety Agency. The loss to the Belgium economy was estimated at €1500-€2000M.
- 1999–2000 – In Afghanistan, there were an estimated 400 cases of liver damage and over 100 deaths due to pyrrolizidine alkaloid poisoning. The food source was not identified.

=== 2001 to 2010 ===
- 2001 – Spanish olive pomace oil was contaminated with polycyclic aromatic hydrocarbons. Contaminated product was recalled.
- 2002 – In Northern Ireland, nitrofurans were detected in 5 (of 45) samples of chicken imported from Thailand and Brazil. The product was withdrawn and destroyed.
- 2002 – In the UK, nitrofurans were detected in 16 (of 77) samples of prawns and shrimps imported from SE Asia. Affected batches were withdrawn and destroyed.
- 2002 – In the UK and Canada, the banned antibiotic, chloramphenicol, was found in honey from China.
- 2002 – In China, 42 people, mostly schoolchildren, died after eating poisoned food from a breakfast shop in the city of Nanjing. More than 300 were also seriously injured. The authority later tried and executed a man who was said to have deliberately poisoned his rival shop's food.
- 2003 – Dioxins were found in animal feed that was contaminated with bakery waste that had been dried by firing with waste wood.
- 2003 – The banned veterinary antibiotic nitrofurans were found in chicken from Portugal. Poultry from 43 farms were destroyed.
- 2004 – Organic free-range chicken were found to contain traces of the banned veterinary drug, nitrofuran. Up to 23 tonnes of affected chicken, originating from a farm in Northern Ireland, were distributed to supermarkets across the UK resulting in a voluntary product recall and consumer warnings.
- 2004 – The Canadian Food Inspection Agency (CFIA) detected chloramphenicol in honey labelled as product of Canada. Chloramphenicol is banned for use in food-producing animals, including honey bees, in Canada as well as in a number of other countries. The CFIA informed Health Canada that five lots of honey labelled as "Product of Canada" were distributed in British Columbia and were found to contain residues of the banned drug chloramphenicol. A voluntary food recall occurred.
- 2004 – New Zealand soy milk manufactured with added kelp contained toxic levels of iodine. Consumption of this product was linked to five cases of thyrotoxicosis. The manufacturer ceased production and re-formulated the product line.
- 2004 – New Zealand cornflour and cornflour-containing products were contaminated with lead, thought to have occurred as a result of bulk shipping of corn (maize) contaminated by previous cargo in the same storage. Affected product was distributed in New Zealand, Fiji and Australia. Four products were recalled.
- 2004 – Aflatoxin-contaminated maize in Kenya resulted in 317 cases of hepatic failure and 125 deaths.
- 2004 – EHEC O104:H4 in South Korea, researchers pointed at contaminated hamburgers as a possible cause.
- 2005 – Worcester sauce in the UK was found to contain the banned food colouring, Sudan I dye, that was traced to imported adulterated chilli powder. 576 food products were recalled.
- 2005 – Farmed salmon in British Columbia, Canada was found to contain the banned fungicide malachite green. 54 tonnes of fish was recalled. The incident resulted in an estimated $2.4-13M (USD) lost revenue.
- 2006 – Pork, in China, containing clenbuterol when pigs were illegally fed the banned chemical to enhance fat burning and muscle growth, affected over 300 persons.
- 2007 – Pet food recalls occurred in North America, Europe, and South Africa as a result of Chinese protein export contamination using melamine as an adulterant.
- 2008 – Baby milk scandal, in China. 300,000 babies affected, 51,900 hospitalisations and 6 infant deaths. Consequences included lost revenue compensation (around $30M), bankruptcy, trade restrictions imposed by 68 countries, 60 or more arrests, executions, prison sentences, and loss of consumer confidence. Melamine from the contaminated protein worked into the food chain a year later.
- 2008 – Wheat flour contaminated with naturally occurring pyrrolizidine alkaloids is thought to be the cause of 38 cases of hepatic veno-occlusive disease, including 4 deaths in Afghanistan.
- 2008 – Irish pork crisis of 2008: Irish pork and pork products exported to 23 countries were traced and much was recalled when animal feed was contaminated with dioxins in the feed drying process. The cost of cattle and pig culling exceeded €4M, compensation for lost revenue was estimated to be €200M.
- 2008 – In Italy, it was discovered that additives included substances like sulfuric acid and hydrochloric acid had been used to dilute wines.
- 2008 – In Italy, dioxin was found in buffalo milk from farms in Caserta. The probable source was groundwater contamination from illegal waste dumping in the triangle of death.
- 2008 United States salmonellosis outbreak – An outbreak of salmonellosis across multiple U.S. states linked to jalapeño peppers imported from Mexico.
- 2009 – Pork, in China, containing the banned chemical clenbuterol when pigs were illegally fed it to enhance fat burning and muscle growth. 70 persons were hospitalised in Guangzhou with stomach pains and diarrhoea after eating contaminated pig organs.
- 2009 – Hola Pops from Mexico contaminated with lead
- 2009 – Bonsoy-brand Soymilk in Australia, enriched with Kombu seaweed resulted in high levels of iodine, and 48 cases of thyroid problems. The product was voluntarily recalled and a settlement of 25 million AUS$ later reached with the victims.
- 2010 – Snakes in China were contaminated with clenbuterol when fed frogs treated with clenbuterol. 13 people were hospitalised after eating contaminated snake. There were 113 prosecutions in 2011 relating to clenbuterol, with sentences ranging from three years imprisonment to death.

=== 2011 to 2020 ===
- 2011 United States listeriosis outbreak – a widespread outbreak of Listeria monocytogenes food poisoning across 28 US states that resulted from contaminated cantaloupes linked to Jensen Farms of Holly, Colorado. As of the final report on 27 August 2012, there were 33 deaths and 147 total confirmed cases since the beginning of the first recorded case on 31 July 2011.
- 2011 – Contaminated illegal alcohol in West Bengal resulted in an estimated 126 deaths. The alcohol may have contained ammonium nitrate and/or methanol.
- 2011 – German E. coli O104:H4 outbreak was caused by EHEC O104:H4 contaminated fenugreek seeds imported from Egypt in 2009 and 2010, from which sprouts were grown in Germany.
- 2011 – Vinegar from China contaminated with ethylene glycol when stored in tanks that previously contained antifreeze, led to 11 deaths and an estimated 120 cases of illness.
- 2011 – Meat, eggs and egg products in Germany contaminated from animal feed containing fat contaminated with dioxins. 4,700 German farms affected. 8,000 hens and hundreds of pigs were culled. Imports from Germany to China were banned.
- 2012 – More than a quarter of a million chicken eggs were recalled in Germany after in-house testing discovered "excessive levels" of the poisonous chemical, dioxin.
- 2012, July – Around 1 million pots of herbs had to be destroyed in North Rhine-Westphalia after treatment with an apparently organic plant growth strengthener was found to contain DDAC (didecyl-dimethylammonium chloride) which resulted in contamination levels above the EU MRL of 0.01 mg/kg. This has resulted in significant additional costs to member states across the EU who put in place a monitoring programme until February 2013 for DDAC and other quaternary ammonium compounds across a wide range of commodity groups.
- 2012, August to September – Multiple American Licorice Company black licorice products recalled due to high lead levels in the products. Consuming a bag of product could give children lead levels as high as 13.2 micrograms/daily limit, double the amount regulators consider actionable.
- 2012, October – Frozen Chinese strawberries contaminated with norovirus infected over 11,000 children in Germany.
- 2013, January – It was disclosed that horse meat contaminated beef burgers had been on sale in Britain and Ireland. Two companies, ABP Food Group and Liffey Meats, had supplied various supermarkets with contaminated own brand burgers from their meat factories in the UK and Ireland.
- 2013, February – In Germany 200 farms are suspected of selling eggs as "organic" but not adhering to the conditions required for the label.
- 2013, March – A batch of 1,800 almond cakes from the Swedish supplier, Almondy, on its way to the IKEA store in Shanghai were found by Chinese authorities to have a too high amount of coliform bacteria and were subsequently destroyed.
- 2013 aflatoxin contamination – Contamination with aflatoxins results in a milk recall in Europe and a dog food recall in the United States in February and March.
- 2013, May – A Chinese crime ring was found to have passed off rat, mink, and small mammal meat as mutton for more than 1 million USD in Shanghai and Jiangsu province markets.
- 2013, May – Halal lamb burgers contained samples of pork DNA, affected 19 schools in Leicester, UK.
- 2013, July – Bihar school meal poisoning incident, India.
- 2013, October – 2013 Taiwan food scandal
- 2014, September – 2014 Taiwan food scandal
- 2015, January – Mozambique funeral beer poisoning. Beer served at a funeral in Mozambique was contaminated with bongkrekic acid, resulting in 75 deaths and more than 230 people falling ill.
- 2015, April – Contaminated milk tea resulted in the deaths of two individuals and affected another in Sampaloc, Manila, the cause of which was determined to have been oxalic acid being deliberately laced at more than the lethal oral dose.
- 2015, April – In the US, Blue Bell Creameries recalled eight million US gallons (30 million L) of ice cream after an outbreak of listeria at one of their production facilities led to ten hospitalizations and three deaths.
- 2015, June – In India and Nepal, lead contamination in Nestlé's Maggi brand instant noodles made headlines in India, with some seven times the allowed limit; several Indian states banned the product, as did Nepal.
- 2015, July – 2015 Caraga candy poisonings in the Philippines.
- 2015, November–December – United States E. coli outbreak.
- 2016, February–March – Mars chocolates contamination incident, in which plastic found in candy bars, leading to a recall affecting 55 countries.
- 2016, April–May – CRF Frozen Foods recalled over 400 frozen food products due to listeria outbreak that sickened 8 people.
- 2016, April–May – 2016 Punjab sweet poisoning, confectioneries contaminated with the toxic insecticide chlorfenapyr caused 33 deaths.
- 2017 fipronil eggs contamination in Europe and Asia.
- 2017-18 South African listeriosis outbreak, linked to contaminated polony. Remains the largest listeriosis outbreak on record.
- 2018 Australian rockmelon listeriosis outbreak, listeriosis traced to rockmelon (also known as cantaloupe) grown in New South Wales, Australia.
- 2018 Australian strawberry contamination, where strawberries were found to contain needles.
- 2019 – Dioxin contamination of eggs in Tropodo, Indonesia. The dioxin is produced by the burning of plastic as fuel for the local tofu industry.
- 2019 – An Internet trend in the United States saw individuals filming themselves opening containers of ice cream from shelves, licking the ice cream, and returning the container to the shelf. One man from Texas was convicted of misdemeanor criminal mischief after filming himself licking Blue Bell ice cream in a Walmart.
- 2019 – A study identified widespread lead chromate adulteration of turmeric, intended to enhance its yellow color, as the primary cause of lead poisoning in Bangladesh, which had been practiced since the 1980s. By 2021, the practice had been effectively eradicated following a massive crackdown by the Bangladesh Food Safety Authority.
- 2020 sesame seeds contamination. Sesame seeds sold in Europe, originating in India, contaminated by ethylene oxide.
- 2020 – 10 people died and 16 were left disabled after an ethylene glycol contamination in Brazilian craft beers produced in Minas Gerais. Made by Backer, the "Belorizontina"-branded beers first showed issues in January 2019, but this information was not presented to health officials. When inspected, the production was shown to be irregular, with a leaking tank and spots of contamination. Their beers were recalled, with 79,481.34 liters of the drink being apprehended in Backer's production line and also markets. Of those, 56,659 bottles were considered too risky for human consumption. Although Anvisa prohibited Backer from operating in 2020 and they were sued almost R$12,000,000 (around U$2,503.390 in 2022), they are allowed to produce again since April 2022, while their victims are still suffering from the poisoning and fighting for justice. On July 21, 2023, Backer settled with the Ministério Público and will have to pay R$500,000 ($104,308 in 2023) to each victim (as of 2023, only 9 are officially recognized) plus $150,000 (U$31,292.38) to each of their first-degree relatives, the same amount of money from the victim's last paycheck and their medical treatment, plus for any job or opportunity lost because of the incident. Some relatives of the people that died say they weren't included in the restitution, because their family members' death happened before the investigation started. To G1, the widow of a 63-year-old man affirmed he was hospitalized and died in February:; "I have 3 reports, including one from the Civil Police, the coroner, I have his necropsy reports, I have a report from the medical board, saying 'We can confirm that Mr. José Osvaldo de Faria was intoxicated by the poison diethylene glycol produced by the Backer Beer'".

=== 2021 to present ===
- 2021 – Butterball recalled over 14,000 lbs of turkey meat due to suspected plastic contamination.
- 2022 – Abbott Nutrition recalled Similac baby formula after the death of an infant from Cronobacter sakazakii. The recall caused significant shortages in baby formula across the United States.
- 2022 – At least 40 dogs died in Brazil after consuming Bassar produced snacks for dental care that were also sold under the Petz brand. The snacks were contaminated with ethylene glycol, probably originating from contaminated propylene glycol. All products made by Bassar were recalled on September 7.
- 2024 – Applesauce products containing cinnamon were found to contain lead chromate, leading to reports of child lead poisoning across the United States. The source of the adulteration was the cinnamon, which was thought to have been adulterated to enhance its weight or color.
- 2024 United Kingdom Shigatoxigenic E. coli outbreak – Supermarket sandwich products containing contaminated salad leaves led to one death and over 200 confirmed cases.
- 2024 Laos methanol poisoning
- 2025 - In Turkey, at least 124 deaths in Istanbul alcohol poisonings
- 2026, January–February - Nestlé recalled baby formula in 25 countries due to potential cereulide toxin contamination.
- 2026, February-March - In the United States, over 30 million pounds of frozen chicken products produced by Ajinomoto Foods North America were recalled for potential glass contamination. Recalled products included brand names Ajinomoto, Kroger, Ling Ling, Tai Pei, and Trader Joe’s.
- 2026, June - The 2026 China Union Soybean Salad Oil Incident in Taiwan region, also referred to as the China Union Oil Salad Oil Carcinogen Excess Incident, and the China Union Toxic Oil Controversy, broke out in Taiwan starting in June 2026. The incident arose after edible oil produced by China Union Oil, whose plant is situated in the Taichung Port zone adjacent to Wuqi Fishing Port in Qingshui District, Taichung City, was found to contain benzo[a]pyrene concentrations exceeding regulatory limits set by Taiwan. Downstream processor Nan Chiao Oil detected the excess contaminants during incoming goods inspection and notified the oil manufacturer. Nevertheless, none of the involved operators promptly notified food safety authorities. Consequently, contaminated oil entered the market supply chain and affected multiple food manufacturers.

== Responses ==
In 2013, Professor Chris Elliott, Professor of Food Safety and Director of the Institute for Global Food Security at Queen's University Belfast, was asked by the UK's Secretaries of State for Defra and Health to undertake a review of the weaknesses within UK food supply networks and to suggest measures which might be taken to address these issues. After an interim report was published in December 2013, his final report was published in July 2014, recommending that the UK adopt a National Food Crime Prevention Framework.

His 8 recommendations, or "eight pillars of food integrity", provided for:

1. maintaining customer confidence in food as a chief priority
2. a "zero tolerance" approach to food fraud or food crime
3. a focus on intelligence gathering
4. the role of laboratory services
5. the value of audit and assurance regimes
6. targeted government support for the integrity and assurance of food supply networks
7. leadership, and
8. crisis management in response to any serious food safety or food crime incident.

== See also ==
- Adulterated food in the United States
- List of foodborne illness outbreaks by death toll
- List of foodborne illness outbreaks
- Gutter oil
- List of man-made mass chronic poisoning incidents
- List of medicine contamination incidents
- List of methanol poisoning incidents
- Identity preservation
