= Vrpolje (disambiguation) =

Vrpolje is a village and a municipality in Slavonia, Croatia.

Vrpolje may also refer to:

- Vrpolje, Posušje, a village in southwestern Bosnia and Herzegovina
- Vrpolje Zagora, a village in southeastern Bosnia and Herzegovina
- Vrpolje Ljubomir, a village in southeastern Bosnia and Herzegovina
- Vrpolje, Šibenik, a village in Šibenik-Knin County, Croatia
- Vrpolje, Knin, a village in Šibenik-Knin County, Croatia
- Vrpolje, Split-Dalmatia County, a village near Trilj, Croatia
