= Ivan Miličević =

Ivan Miličević may refer to:

- Ivan Miličević (footballer, born 1988), Croatian footballer
- Ivan Miličević (footballer, born 1998), Bosnia and Herzegovina footballer
- Ivan Miličević (2001–2021), victim in the 2021 Tribistovo poisoning
