= 2021 Tribistovo poisoning =

Carbon monoxide poisoning event in Bosnia and Herzegovina

- Date: 1 January 2021
- Time: Between 04:00–10:00 CET
- Location: Tribistovo, Bosnia and Herzegovina; 43°31′26.4″N 17°21′3.3″E Tribistovo (Bosnia and Herzegovina) Tribistovo (Europe)
- Type: Carbon monoxide poisoning
- Deaths: 8

On 1 January 2021, around 10:00 CET, in the village of Tribistovo, near the town of Posušje, Bosnia and Herzegovina, eight teenagers – four boys and four girls – were found dead in a holiday cottage after a New Year's Eve celebration. The cause of death was determined as suffocation from carbon monoxide poisoning, instigated by a power generator used to heat the cottage.

The tragedy received widespread media coverage from many local and international outlets, prompting a national day of mourning on 2 January, while the Government of the West Herzegovina Canton declared three days of mourning from 2–4 January. The Government of Croatia declared a national day of mourning on 5 January. The victims' funerals were attended by thousands of citizens from both countries.

A monument was sculpted by Ilija Skočibušić and installed at the site of the tragedy where the cottage stood. It was blessed and opened to the public on 3 August 2024.

== Timeline ==
The victims, all of whom were aged 19 and from the municipality of Posušje, organized a private New Year's Eve celebrations at a cottage in the village of Tribistovo. They gathered at the foot of Mt. Radovan near Blidinje Nature Park, where they met up with a larger group of friends.

Family and friends kept in touch with the victims until around 04:00 CET, when they ceased to respond to further calls and messages. Around that time, the eight victims separated from the rest of the group and went to a different cottage to spend the night. Due to a lack of electricity, they used a power generator for internal heating. The generator was situated in an adjacent room separated by a window which was left open by one of the victims before falling asleep.

Around 10:00 CET, occupants and residents of nearby homes noticed that nobody had yet left the cottage. After receiving no answer at the door and noticing that the generator was still running, they forced entry by breaking one of the windows. The victims were found unconscious on the floor, some in an upright sitting position. Upon realizing that they had no pulse, the residents immediately called the emergency services, who could do nothing but to declare death upon arrival.

After the scene was investigated, the bodies were sent for an autopsy at the Clinical Hospital Mostar.

== Victims ==
All eight of the victims were ethnic Herzegovinian Croats born in 2001. They were identified as:

- Marija Pavković; born 16 April 2001 in Split and residing in Vrpolje, student at the Faculty of Electrical Engineering, Mechanical Engineering and Naval Architecture, University of Split
- Mia Soldo; born 4 August 2001 in Split and residing in Sutina, student at the Faculty of Law, University of Mostar
- Stjepan Jukić; born 9 August 2001 in Mostar and residing in Batin, student at the Faculty of Natural Sciences, Mathematics and Education, University of Mostar
- Ivan Miličević; born 29 August 2001 in Posušje and residing in Poklečani, student at the Faculty of Mechanical Engineering, Computer Engineering and Electrical Engineering, University of Mostar
- Mirela Rezo; born 8 September 2001 in Switzerland and residing in Posušje, student at the Faculty of Science, University of Split
- Žana Pavković; born 15 September 2001 in Split and residing in Vrpolje, student at the Faculty of Humanities, University of Mostar
- Stipe Pavković; born 22 September 2001 in Mostar and residing in Vrpolje, student at the Faculty of Mechanical Engineering, Computer Engineering and Electrical Engineering, University of Mostar
- Stipe Romić; born 27 September 2001 in Posušje and residing in Poklečani, student at the Faculty of Electrical Engineering, Mechanical Engineering and Naval Architecture, University of Split

Jukić and Rezo were buried on 3 January in the Martića križ Cemetery in Posušje. A day later, the remaining six victims were buried in three different graveyards in Rakitno–Ivanovica Cemetery, Petrovića Cemetery and Stećci Cemetery–in a ceremony led by Bishop of Mostar-Duvno, Petar Palić.

== Reactions ==
=== Local and cantonal ===
The Mayor of the Municipality of Posušje, Ante Begić, stated: "What is there to say after an event like this, I simply cannot believe that such a tragedy occurred. This is immemorial." He later called for local businesses to close for the day out of respect for the victims.

Prime Minister of the West Herzegovina Canton, Zdenko Ćosić, visibly distressed, stated: "This is a tragedy which will mark not only this year. I personally cannot imagine anything worse and more tragic than losing your loved ones, losing your children. Ours is to do what we can do, to express solidarity and condolences to the families who lost their children, to be together with them in our prayers and all other ways." The Government of the West Herzegovina Canton declared three days of mourning from 2 to 4 January.

The same day the bodies were discovered, several hundreds of citizens of Posušje gathered on the Croatian Veterans Square in the town to light candles and pay homage to the victims.

In July 2023, the Municipality of Posušje Mayor's Office announced the construction of a monument, planned by Ilija Skočibušić, in the city.

=== National ===
The Croat member of the Presidency of Bosnia and Herzegovina, Željko Komšić, sent a telegraph, stating: "We were shaken by this sad news about the death of young people, which makes the tragedy even more painful. To the family and friends of the deceased, I send my deepest condolences and I sympathize with their pain. I am asking the Council of Ministers to declare a national day of mourning in the entire Bosnia and Herzegovina." President of the Croatian Democratic Union of Bosnia and Herzegovina (HDZ BiH) and the former Croat member of the Presidency of Bosnia and Herzegovina, Dragan Čović, stated: "It is difficult to find the right words of consolation after this immemorial tragedy and dark day for the entire country. I am expressing my deepest condolences, while sincerely sympathizing with your pain and common prayer that their souls find peace. May they rest in peace."

The Bosniak member of the Presidency of Bosnia and Herzegovina, Šefik Džaferović, stated: "I was deeply shaken by the news about the great tragedy near Posušje and the death of eight young people. To the families and friends of deceased girls and boys, I send my most sincere condolences and I sympathize with their pain." Vice-chairman of the House of Representatives of Bosnia and Herzegovina, Denis Zvizdić, sent another telegraph, saying: "I was heavily shaken by the awful tragedy that happened on the first day of the new year, in which eight young people passed away. I express sincere condolences to the families of deceased young men and women and I pray to God that He gives them persistence and strength after their great loss." Vice-chairwoman of the Council of Ministers of Bosnia and Herzegovina and the Minister of Foreign Affairs, Bisera Turković, also sent a telegraph, stating: "I received the news about the tragedy in Posušje with deep sadness, pain and disbelief. As the Vice-chairwoman of the Council of Ministers and the Minister of Foreign Affairs of our country, I send my deepest compassion with their irreparable loss to the parents, family members, relatives and friends. This is a great loss for the entire Bosnia and Herzegovina. I pray to God that He gives them strength and persistence in these difficult moments." Prime Minister of the Federation of Bosnia and Herzegovina, Fadil Novalić, sent a telegraph, stating: "With great sadness, we received the news about the awful tragedy in which eight young people in Posušje lost their lives. We sympathize with the families in these moments of their irreparable loss. In my personal name, and in the name of the Government of the Federation of Bosnia and Herzegovina, I send my most sincere condolences to the families of the deceased." Vice-chairman of the House of Peoples of Bosnia and Herzegovina, president of the Party of Democratic Action (SDA) and former Bosniak member of the Presidency of Bosnia and Herzegovina, Bakir Izetbegović, stated: "With sadness and disbelief, I received the news about the awful tragedy in Posušje. I express my deepest condolences to the families and friends, and I pray to God that He gives them persistence in these painful moments."

The Serb member of the Presidency of Bosnia and Herzegovina, Milorad Dodik, sent a telegraph to the families of the victims, saying: "I received the news about the great tragedy that happened to you with sadness. I am sending you my deepest compassion with your pain." Chairman of the Council of Ministers of Bosnia and Herzegovina, Zoran Tegeltija, sent a telegraph to the families of the victims, saying: "In great sadness, I received the news about the loss of young lives in an accident during the New Year's Eve night in Posušje. In the name of the Council of Ministers and my personal name, I send you my deepest condolences. In these difficult moments, our thoughts are with you." President of Republika Srpska, Željka Cvijanović, sent another telegraph, saying: "In sadness and grief, I received the news about the loss of young lives who had future ahead of themselves. In these, for you hardest moments, in the name of citizens of Republika Srpska and my personal name, I send you my deepest condolences and support."

Archbishop of Vrhbosna, Vinko Puljić, stated: "The sad news broke out on the first day of new year about the tragic death of eight young people. I am extremely shaken by that event and encouraged to express my sincerest Christian condolences and human solidarity to the grieving families, as well as the entire community of believers from where the deceased come from. May the Lord illuminate the souls of the late young people with eternal light and may He present them with joyful eternity in His divine love. To all the grieving ones, I wish the consolation of faith that the Risen Lord presented us with, assuring us of the resurrection of the dead and eternal life." Mufti of Mostar, Salem Effendi Dedović, sent a letter to the Bishop of Mostar-Duvno, Petar Palić, stating: "As the church ordinarius in charge, I send you sympathy for the great tragedy in Posušje where eight young people lost their lives. We are asking you to give the parents of the deceased youth, whose pain and sadness we share, our deepest condolences. We pray to dear God to present them with faith, strength and persistence to endure this great temptation by which they are tempted."

2 January was declared a day of mourning in the entire Bosnia and Herzegovina. 4 January was declared a day of mourning in the Federation of Bosnia and Herzegovina.

=== International ===
Prime Minister of Croatia, Andrej Plenković, stated: "In disbelief and great grief, I received the news about the tragic loss of eight young lives on the New Year's Eve night in Tribistovo near Posušje. In these difficult moments for the families and friends of the victims, I am asking you to receive my sincere condolences in the name of the Government of Croatia and the people of Croatia." President of Croatia, Zoran Milanović, stated: "In great sadness and grief, I received the shocking news about the tragedy in which eight young lives were lost in Tribistovo near Posušje. I express my deepest condolences to the families, relatives and friends of all deceased young women and men." Croatian Minister of Foreign and European Affairs, Gordan Grlić-Radman, stated: "Shaken by the tragedy in the municipality of Posušje, where eight young people lost their lives last night due to gas poisoning, I express my condolences to the families and the loved ones. In a phone call with Mayor Begić, I expressed my grief for this tragedy that brought darkness over Posušje."

Croatia declared 5 January the national day of mourning.

President of Serbia, Aleksandar Vučić, sent a letter, saying: "It is a loss, not only for your country, but the entire region, which is building its future on the young people and their energy. With great sadness, in the name of citizens of the Republic of Serbia and my personal name, I express my condolences and I ask you to give them to their families and friends." President of Montenegro, Milo Đukanović, sent a telegraph, saying: "Montenegro shares the pain of friends and neighbors for the tragically lost young lives. Please give my sincerest condolences to the families of the victims."

== See also ==
- 2021 in Bosnia and Herzegovina
- ToNiePokój escape room fire – five teenage girls in Koszalin, Poland, died of carbon monoxide poisoning while they were locked in an escape room
- List of man-made mass poisoning incidents
