= 2024 Gudauri carbon monoxide poisoning =

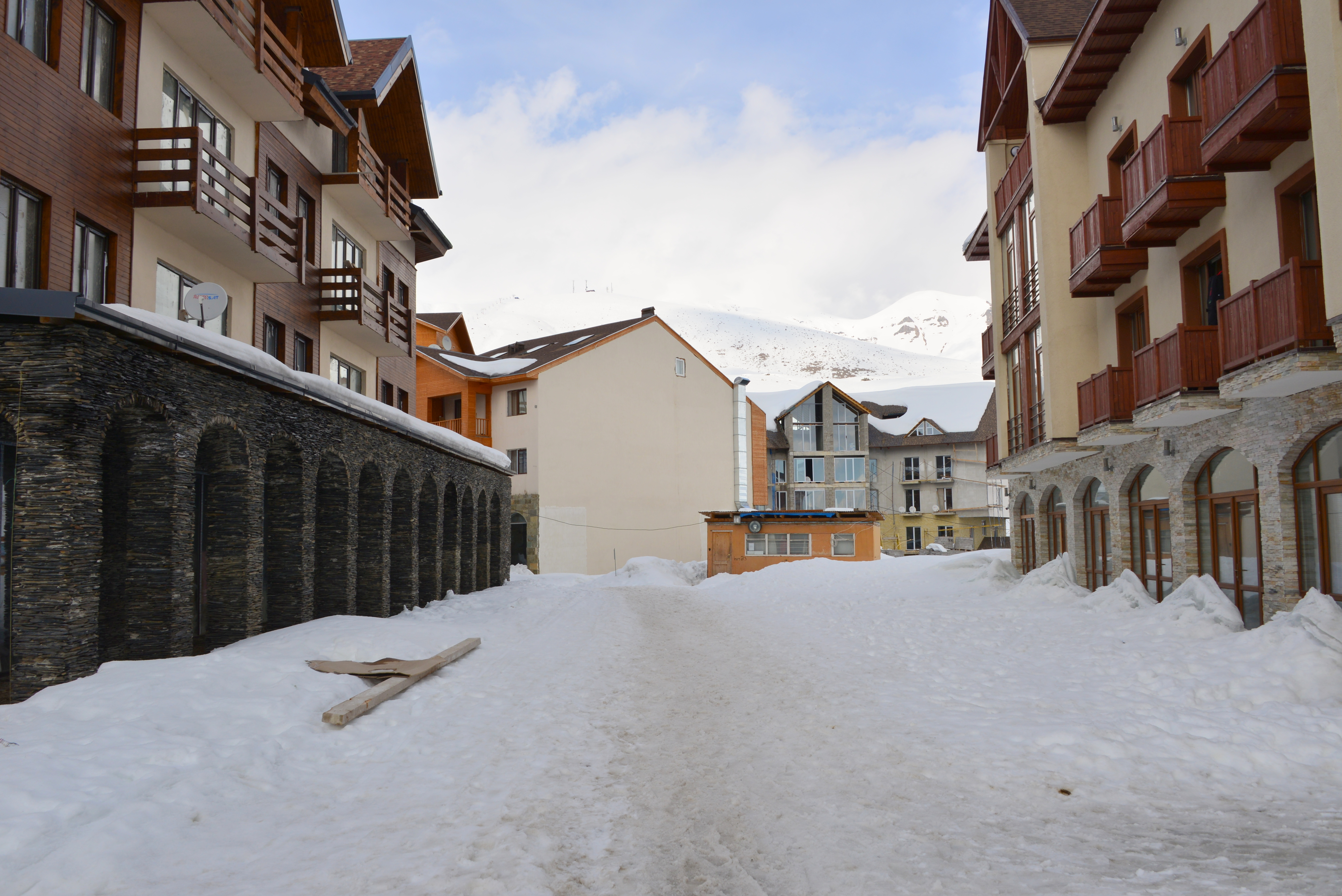
- Gudauri in winter
- Date: 14 December 2024
- Location: Gudauri in Kazbegi Municipality, Mtskheta-Mtianeti, Georgia; 42°28′33″N 44°28′43″E
- Cause: carbon monoxide poisoning
- Deaths: 12

On 14 December 2024, the bodies of 12 individuals were discovered in a quarters billet of an Indian restaurant in Gudauri, Georgia. The victims were employees of the restaurant, and included 11 Indian nationals and one Georgian citizen.

It was the worst accident in the region since a helicopter crash in 2022, where eight people died.

== Background ==
In Gudauri, there was an Indian restaurant, Havel, where mostly Indian employees worked. The restaurant was in the building on the first floor, while the workers had lodgings on the second floor.

== Tragedy ==
The day before the accident, there was a storm in Gudauri that caused a power outage. In order to be able to heat the lodgings, electric generators using fuel oil were placed in a closed area near the rooms. Fumes from the generator caused carbon monoxide poisoning.

The victims later felt nauseous from the carbon monoxide and were unable to escape. On the second day, the restaurant owner discovered the corpses.

The bodies showed no signs of violence, ruling out foul play.

== Victims ==
In the accident 12 people were killed, all of whom were restaurant workers. Eleven of them had Indian citizenship, and one person was a 25-year-old Georgian woman who worked as a waitress in the restaurant. The Indian citizens were natives of Punjab. Among them were a married couple. Most of the Indian victims recently moved to Georgia in search of employment opportunities.

== Results ==
The incident quickly went viral on social media, where users expressed grief and outrage, particularly over potential lapses in safety standards. Government officials and community leaders called for stricter enforcement of safety regulations regarding the use of power generators, while Indian diplomatic representatives coordinated with Georgian authorities to assist in repatriating the victims' remains.
