= Kobayashi red yeast rice scandal =

Supplement contamination causing kidney injury and death

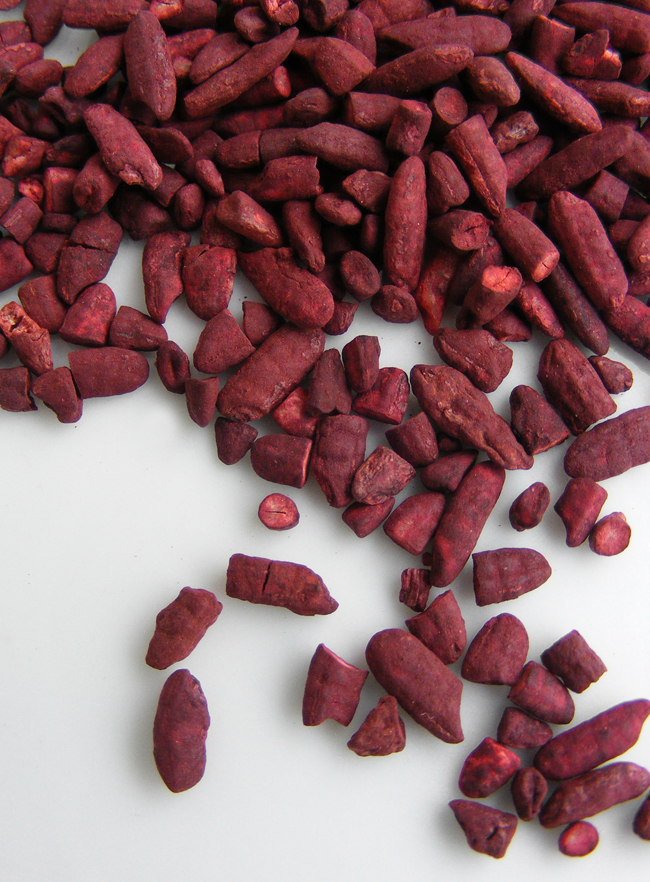
- Red yeast rice
- Date: 22 March 2024 – ongoing (2 years, 2 months and 30 days)
- Location: Japan, Taiwan
- Type: Cholesterol-lowering medication and food products
- Cause: Puberulic acid contamination
- Deaths: Up to 80
- Injuries: 500+, 94,000+ consultations

The Kobayashi red yeast rice scandal (Japanese: 小林製薬紅麹サプリメント問題) is an ongoing widespread supplement contamination that was first noted on 22 March 2024, resulting in numerous health problems to people taking the supplements in Japan and Taiwan. Up to 80 people died after taking the supplements, with at least 500 more hospitalized. Kobayashi Pharmaceutical officially discontinued production of beni koji products on 8 August 2024.

== Incident ==
On 22 March 2024, authorities reported that five people had died after consuming three products produced by Kobayashi Pharmaceutical, including "Red Koji Cholesterol Help". More than 240 people were hospitalized due to taking the supplement, and a total of 94,000 consultations were made, leading to a mandated recall as they were suspected of containing toxic and harmful substances. Kobayashi Pharmaceutical red yeast rice supplements were also supplied to other companies and used in confectionery, bread, sake, miso, and several other products, expanding the distribution of contaminated red yeast rice. The damage spread to Taiwan where Kobayashi Pharmaceutical red yeast rice was sold. Six cases of acute kidney failure and other health problems were reported, prompting a recall of the ingredients and products using them from about 100 companies. Taiwanese companies recalled 154 products linked to the contaminated red yeast rice supplements.

On 28 June 2024, the Ministry of Health, Labour and Welfare announced that 76 new deaths suspected to be related to taking the supplement had been discovered. As of 28 June 2024, Kobayashi Pharmaceutical had received 170 inquiries from about the deaths of family members, of which 76 were from people who had taken the product and died, and another three were from doctors positing no causal relationship between taking the supplement and deaths. On 2 July, the city of Osaka requested the government of Mie Prefecture to investigate a case relating to the death to provide further information on the contamination and its spread.

== Health issues ==
According to Dr. Ryuta Fujimura of the Department of Nephrology at the Higashiosaka Municipal Medical Center, who examined the hospitalized patients, the symptoms common to the victims were severe damage to the renal tubules which became crusted, chronic fatigue, loss of appetite, vomiting, and frequent urination, as well as an extreme deterioration in kidney test results, which were consistent with Fanconi syndrome.

Good Manufacture Practice (GMP) certification requires an external inspection every year. Kobayashi Pharmaceutical did not have GMP certification, and had no opportunity to have a third party check it. Under the guidelines for voluntary recalls, Kobayashi Pharmaceutical had a policy of not recalling products until a causal relationship could be established to some extent, possibly resulting in further widespread health issues.

Of the 76 deaths where a causal relationship is suspected, in addition to kidney-related diseases, Kobayashi Pharmaceutical claimed that some were due to other diseases (cancer, cerebral infarction, pneumonia, aortic dissection, etc.) requiring further inquiry. On 30 June 2024, The Japanese Society of Nephrology announced that approximately 85% of over 100 patients reported have not returned to normal kidney function over a month after ceasing the supplement.

== Causes ==
As of June 2024, the precise cause has not been determined, but it has been discovered that the batches manufactured between June and August 2023 and in which the health damage was confirmed contained puberulic acid and two unknown compounds with a basic structure similar to that of lovastatin (monacolin K), which was an active ingredient in the supplement. Animal experiments confirmed that puberulic acid causes kidney damage.

Due to prior research indicating the risk of causing kidney disfunction, in Switzerland, sales of red yeast rice are illegal, France, and the European Union have expressed safety concerns, Germany issued a warning not to consume it, and Taiwan recommends that people with chronic diseases seek professional medical advice before taking it.

The mold used to make red yeast rice is called "koji mold", with there being several types of koji mold. The type most commonly used in Japan is Aspergillus oryzae, which is classified as part of the Aspergillus genus. It is used in sake, soy sauce, miso, mirin, amazake, and other products, with no reported health problems. In contrast, red koji mold is a species classified as Monascus, and is used in Chinese and Taiwanese fermented bean curd. Some red koji molds produce a mycotoxin called citrinin, which is known to cause kidney disease, but the product uses red koji mold that does not have the gene to synthesize citrinin, and in fact no citrinin was detected. On March 29, the possibility that the "unknown substance" was puberulic acid was first postulated.

The Japanese Society of Nephrology conducted a survey of doctors and reported that as of 4 April, 95 people who had taken "Red Koji Cholesterol Help" and other products reported health problems, with the majority of patients showing symptoms that appeared to be Fanconi syndrome, with about three-quarters of patients reporting that their symptoms improved once they stopped taking the supplement.

Puberulic acid was detected in the blue mold from the Osaka and Wakayama factories, which was produced by modifying monacolin K. An inspection by Osaka City officials indicated that the cultivation period in the factory was 50 days, three times longer than usual, in order to increase the concentration. Additionally, earlier reports stated in April 2023 that there were hygiene issues with raw material production, which included picking up and reusing ingredients that had spilled on the floor.

=== Puberulic acid ===
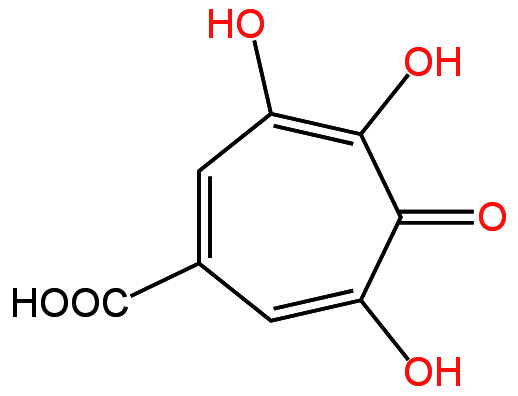
On March 29th, the possibility emerged that the substance contaminating the supplements was puberulic acid.

The red yeast rice that caused the health problems was made at a factory in Osaka. The unknown substance found in the product was found to be puberulic acid, derived from blue mold, but there have only been six research papers on puberulic acid, and research into it has been very limited. According to a company that produces red yeast rice, red koji mold is very delicate compared to other fungi and is easily infested with bacteria, so thorough hygiene management is important. It was also revealed that Kobayashi Pharmaceutical had a unique manufacturing method that included culturing it for more than three times the normal period to increase the concentration of its ingredients. Professor Shinjiro Tachibana of the University of the Ryukyus pointed out that if the product is cultivated for a long time, it becomes difficult to control the temperature and moisture because additional work is required, such as adding water. The increased maintenance increases the risk of contamination. Professor Toshiro Watanabe of Sonoda Women's University pointed out that there is a risk of water entering through cracks in the tanks, a problem typical of aging factories. The presence of blue mold can be noticed in the early stages when the product is not red, but it is highly likely that it will not be noticed after red koji has developed. On April 19, several other substances not supposed to be found in the product were also found in addition to puberulic acid.

On 28 May, the Ministry of Health, Labour and Welfare reported on a study by the National Institute of Health Sciences and the Osaka Institute of Health and Safety, administering puberulic acid or red yeast rice supplements to rats caused renal tubular necrosis, although a certain causal link could not be established.

== List of major recalled products ==
List of major recalled products related to Kobayashi Pharmaceutical Red Yeast Rice
Company	Merchandise	Recall date
Kobayashi Pharmaceutical	"Red Koji Cholesterol Help" "Naishi Help + Cholesterol" "Nattokinase Smooth Grain GOLD"	March 22, 2024
ZERO PLUS	"Rich cheese rice crackers that help lower bad cholesterol"	March 22, 2024
Marine Food	"Tofu"	March 22, 2024
Bread Kawabata	"Bread of Life (Red Koji Bread)"	March 22, 2024
Kanaya Hotel Bakery	"Kanaya Hotel Bakery Brand" "Strawberry Bread" "Strawberry Roll" "Spring Anpan"	March 22, 2024
Tokura Shoji	"Red koji powder 1P-D・K" "Red koji powder 3P-D1"	March 22, 2024
Takara Shuzo	"Shochikubai Shirakabegura "Mio" PREMIUM <ROSE> 750ml" "Shochikubai Shirakabegura "Mio" PREMIUM <ROSE> 300ml"	March 23, 2024
Ministop	"Direct-fire grilled spicy beef offal"	April 2, 2024
QVC Japan	"Revisio Sakura Yanagida Yeast Plus"	April 4, 2024
Social Welfare Corporation Kyoto Ikusei no Kai	"Baked goods: Four Seasons"	April 4, 2024
Toms	"Super Mineko"	April 10, 2024
Nissin Pharmaceutical Co., Ltd.	"Triple Mega Support PREMIUM"	April 15, 2024
フレンド	"Red yeast rice"	April 16, 2024

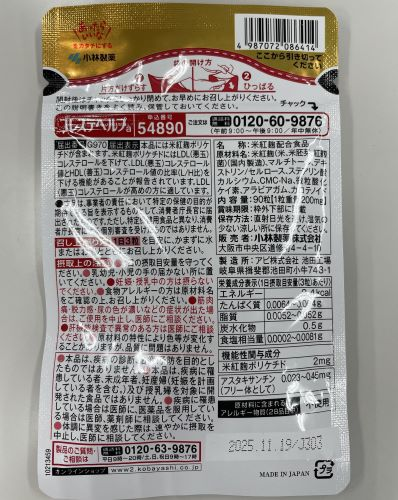
Monascus purpureus

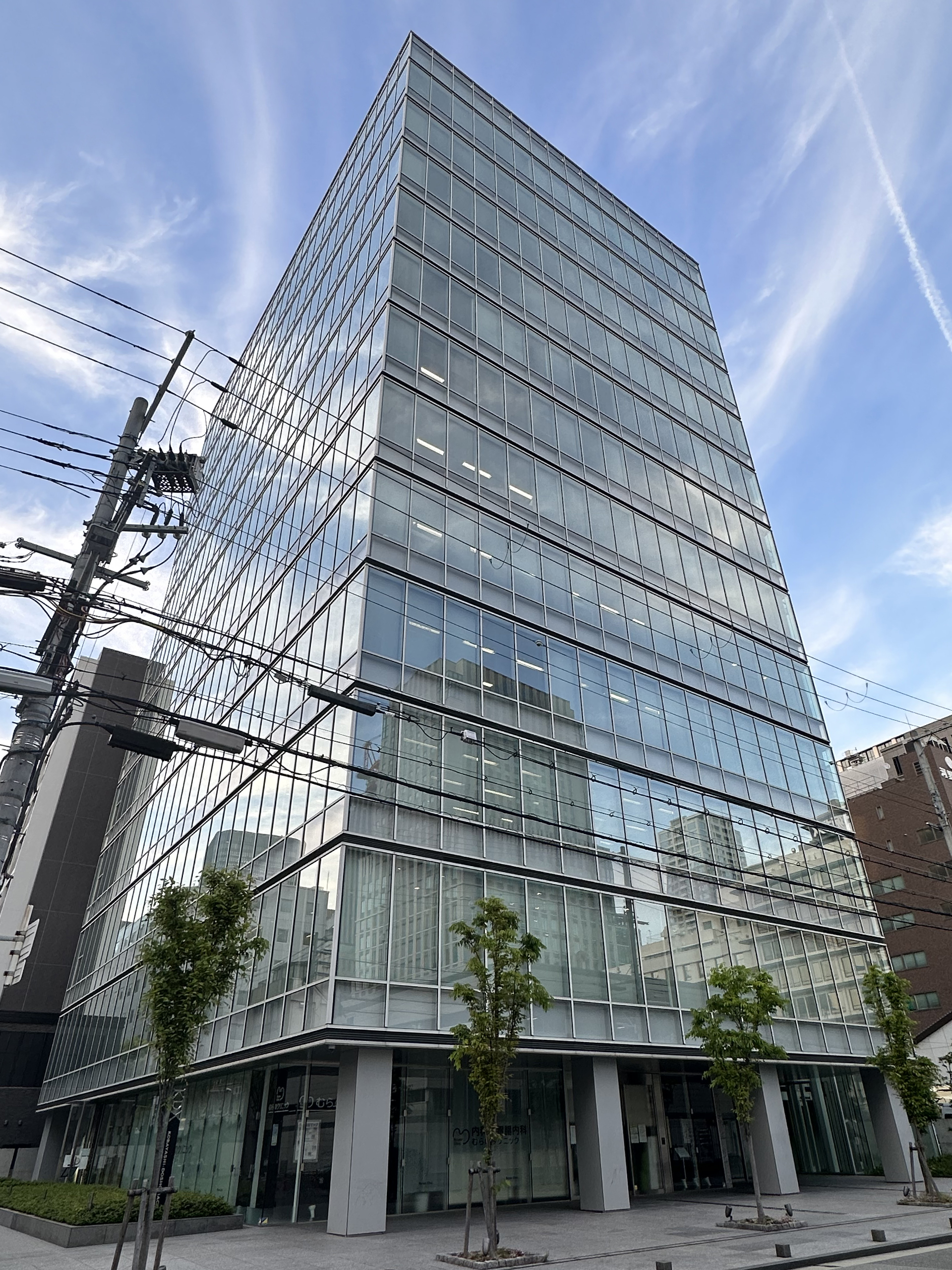
Kobayashi Pharmaceutical, Chūō-ku, Osaka

== Reactions ==
Kobayashi Pharmaceutical began airing an apology commercial on April 6, 2024, showing an apology displayed in black text on a white background, stating:

"Kobayashi Pharmaceutical offers an apology and request. We deeply apologize for the inconvenience caused by our red koji products."

"Currently, there have been reports of health problems with Red Koji Cholesterol Help and other products, and we are conducting a recall of the products. We ask that you do not consume any products you have in your hands and cooperate with the recall."

"Please check our website for health consultations, etc."

In addition, the company posted an apology regarding refunds on its official website.

On 23 July, Kobayashi Pharmaceutical Chair Kazumasa Kobayashi and his son Akihiro Kobayashi, the President resigned from their posts. The company reported 279 deaths, 2,274 hospital visits with 461 required hospitalization from the effects of its beni kōji red yeast rice supplements. The firm continues probe into 80 deaths.

== See also ==
- Four Big Pollution Diseases of Japan
- Morinaga Milk arsenic poisoning incident
- Yushō disease
