= Morinaga Milk Industry =

Japanese food company

Morinaga Milk Industry Co., Ltd.

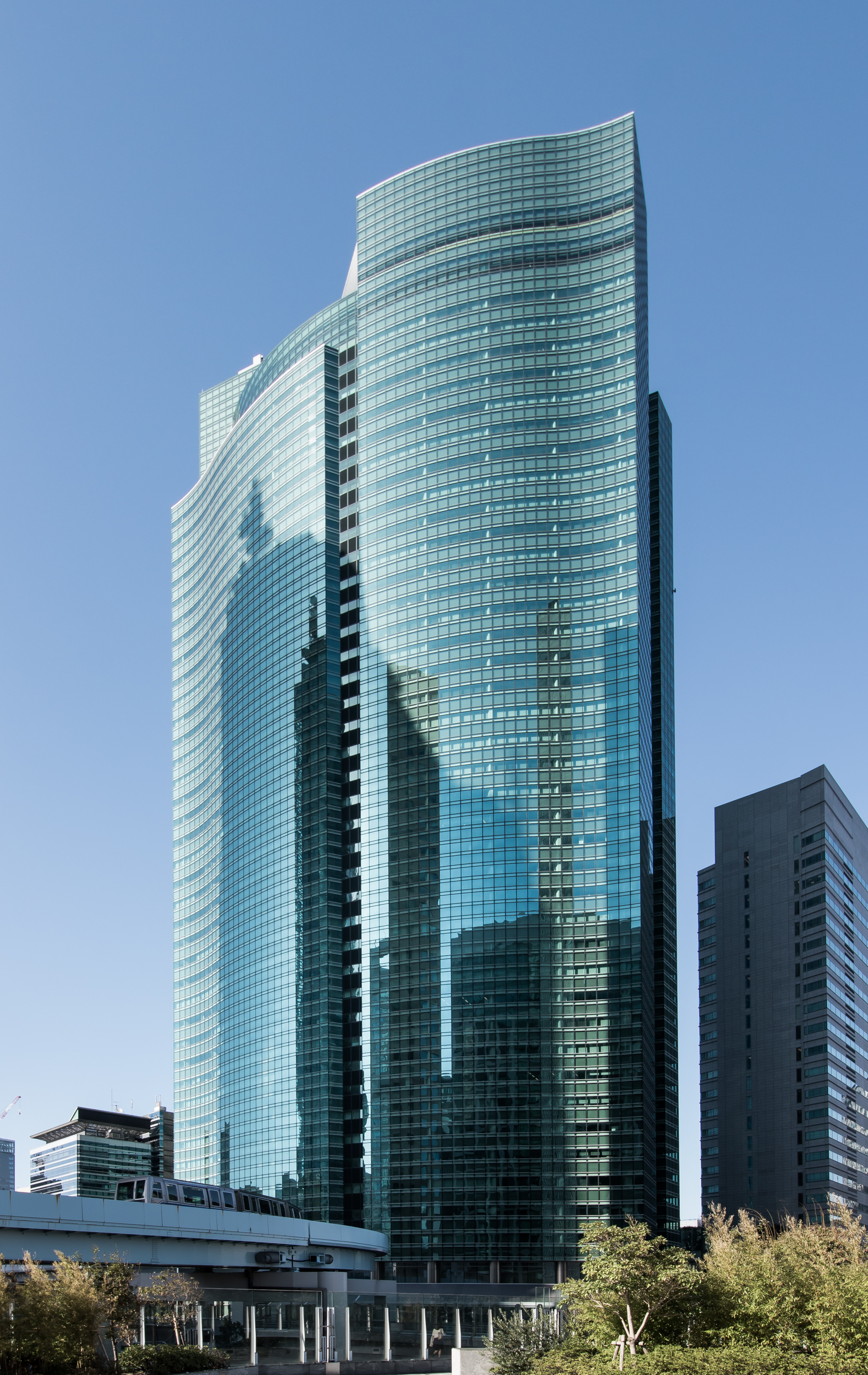
- Native name: 森永乳業株式会社
- Romanized name: Morinaga Nyūgyō Kabushiki-gaisha
- Type: Public
- Traded as: TYO: 2264
- Industry: Food processing
- Predecessor: Nippon Rennyu Co., Ltd.
- Founded: September 1, 1917; 109 years ago
- Headquarters: Tokyo, Japan
- Area served: Worldwide
- Key people: Yohichi Ohnuki (President, Representative Director)
- Products: Milk; Dairy; Ice cream; Beverages
- Net income: ¥27,023 (March 2022)
- Total assets: ¥387,255 (March 2022)
- Number of employees: 3,349; 6,839 (consolidated), as of March 31, 2022
- Website: www.morinagamilk.co.jp

Morinaga Milk Industry Co., Ltd. (森永乳業株式会社, Morinaga Nyūgyō Kabushiki-gaisha) is a milk products and sweets company based in Tokyo, Japan, in operation since September 1, 1917. Their products include milk products, drinks, candy, confectioneries, and infant formula. Morinaga has distribution agreements with Mondelez International and Kalbe Farma. Its subsidiaries include Morinaga Hokuriku Dairy. Morinaga Milk celebrated its 100th anniversary in 2017. In addition to condensed milk and infant formula, products that it has offered since its founding, it has also produced a wide range of products based on milk, including Morinaga Milk, Bifidus Yogurt, Creap (creaming powder), and Mt. RAINIER CAFFE LATTE.

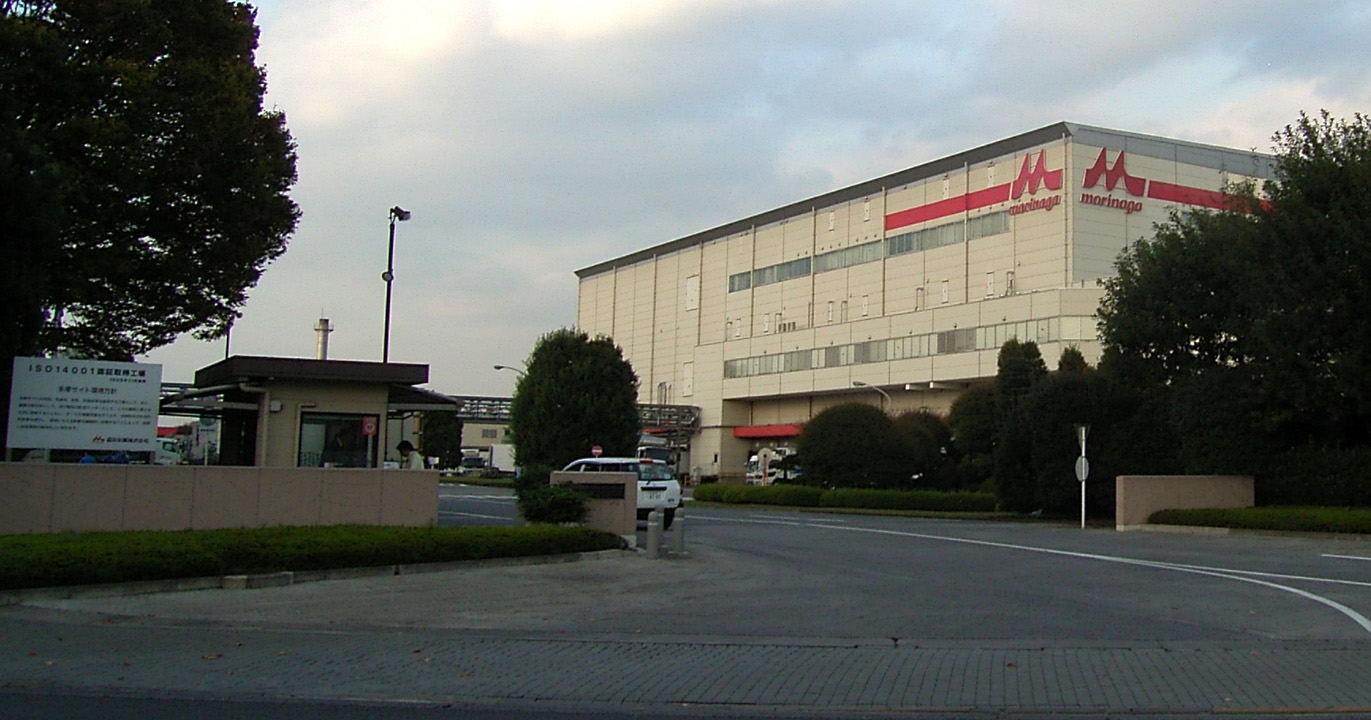
Morinaga Milk Industry

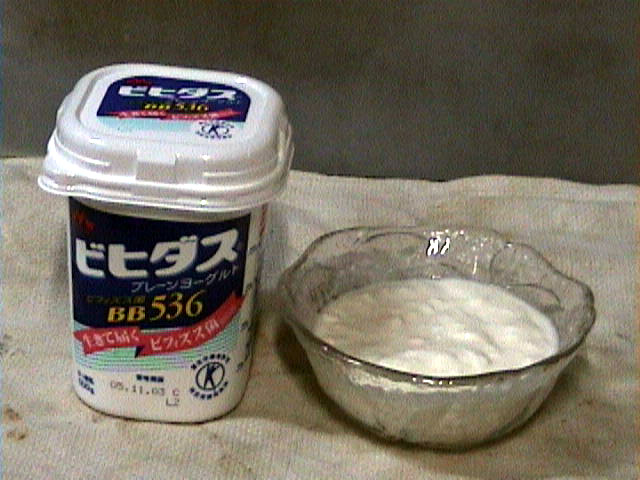
Bifidus yogurt

== See also ==
- Morinaga Milk arsenic poisoning incident
