= Morinaga Milk arsenic poisoning incident =

1955 food safety incident in Japan

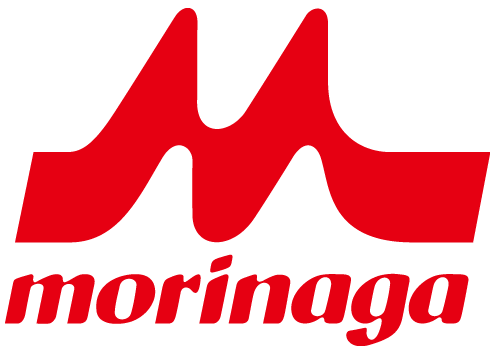
Morinaga Milk logo

The Morinaga Milk arsenic poisoning incident occurred in 1955 in Japan and is believed to have resulted in the deaths of over 100 infants. The incident occurred when arsenic was inadvertently added to dried milk via the use of an industrial grade monosodium phosphate additive. This incident also led to negative health effects for thousands of other infants and individuals, which has had lingering health effects.

== Events ==
From June 1955, certain infants in western Japan came down with a strange sickness that was characterized by diarrhea or constipation, vomiting, a swollen abdomen, and a darkening of skin color. All of the infants shared the same characteristic: they were bottle-fed powdered milk, which was eventually discovered to be the Morinaga Milk brand. News coverage of the rash of infants suffering and dying from the illness did not initially mention Morinaga Milk and one news reporter claimed that they were discreetly told to stop feeding their infant Morinaga Milk brand powdered milk after the child fell ill. The company was not named until August of that year.

=== Lawsuit ===
According to William R. Cullen, Morinaga Milk showed little interest over studies of the surviving affected infants, which resulted in some boycotting the company's products during the 1960s. The company was brought to trial; however the Tokushima District Court found them not guilty as well as denying any recompense for the survivors. This decision was subjected to a review by an appellate court in Takamatsu high court, which resulted in the not guilty verdict being reversed on March 31, 1966. After a rejected final appeal three years later, the Tokushima District Court found the Morinaga Milk's head of factory production guilty and sentenced him to three years in prison.

== Long term consequences ==
Since the poisoning, multiple studies have been conducted on its survivors. Many have reported that they still suffer chronic health problems, and studies have also reported "substantially higher rates of sensory deficits and mental retardation in adolescent survivors of the Morinaga poisonings". A study in 2006 showed that many of the affected still suffered chronic health problems. Arsenic is a neurotoxin, so a disproportionate amount of them had developmental delays, epilepsy, and lower IQ scores. They were also below average height. During the civil suit process, the committee selected to make a ruling against Morinaga decided that the aftereffects of the victims were not a product of arsenic poisoning. Instead, they insisted that they were due to previous illness. The committee intentionally tricked the public into believing that the aftereffects were the result of an unfortunate natural disaster rather than a perpetrated crime. In April 1974, the Hikari Foundation was established in order to help the Morinaga poisoning victims. By the end of March 1983, there were 13,396 victims of the Morinaga milk poisonings, 6,389 of whom were in communication with the Hikari Foundation. The work of the Foundation centred mostly on the development of the victims' independence as well as on creating social conditions for that development. The members of the Foundation were mostly parents who had been involved with the protection association.

== See also ==
- 1858 Bradford sweets poisoning
- 1900 English beer poisoning
- Toxic oil syndrome
- 1985 diethylene glycol wine scandal
- 2008 Chinese milk poisoning
- Kobayashi red yeast rice scandal
