= Ljubo Ćesić Rojs =

Croatian politician and soldier (born 1958)

Ljubo Ćesić
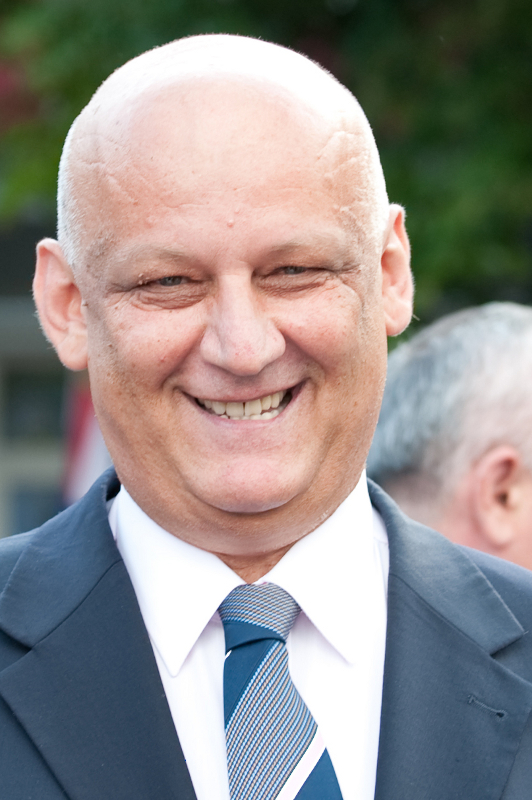
- Ćesić in 2011
- Born: 20 February 1958 (age 68); Batin, PR Bosnia and Herzegovina, FPR Yugoslavia
- Occupations: Army General, Politician

Ljubo Ćesić (born 20 February 1958), best known by his nickname Rojs, is a retired Croatian army general and politician.

== Military service ==
A native Herzegovinian Croat, Ćesić moved to Zagreb in 1984, where he got a job as a bus driver. He came into public spotlight during the 1990s and Yugoslav Wars (Croatian War of Independence and Bosnian War) as commander of the 66th Engineering Regiment of the Croatian Army. His unit built mountain roads on the border between the two countries, which ultimately allowed Croatian Army to outflank the Serb Krajina and Bosnian Serb forces during and after Operation Storm in August 1995. For his exploits, Ćesić was promoted to the rank of general.

His critics often point out the fact that before the war, he was a bus driver, becoming the official driver of Croatia's defence minister Gojko Šušak in 1991, after which he was given military command despite lack of formal qualification.

== Post-war ==
His post-war activities included the use of his unit for civilian contracts and the alleged breach of labour and other laws did not prevent Ćesić from rising through the ranks of the Croatian Democratic Union (HDZ) political party.

== Political activities ==
In the early 2000s, while a member of Croatian Parliament, Ćesić gradually began distancing himself from Ivo Sanader and the new centrist course of HDZ. He nevertheless formally remained in the party, while keeping himself in public spotlight with a series of statements that were as colorful as they were controversial. One example was his public offer to George W. Bush to volunteer in the 2003 invasion of Iraq. One of his controversial public episodes was an altercation and alleged physical attack on a fellow parliament member Dino Debeljuh in 2001, which resulted in Ljubo Ćesić's removal from that day's parliament session.

In the 2005 presidential election he ran as an independent candidate. During the campaign he claimed to be in contact with the general Ante Gotovina, at the time a fugitive wanted on war crimes charges, which prompted a police inquiry. Ćesić eventually finished 6th in the first round with 1.85% of the votes cast. Ćesić has since left HDZ and is currently a member of Only Croatia – Movement for Croatia.

After his political career he started appearing in numerous comedy shows on Croatian television such as Robert Knjaz's Mjenjačnica, in which two or more celebrities exchange lives with each other for a brief period of time. In the episode where he appeared, his companion was Croatia's most famous and controversial stylist Neven Ciganović.

In 2023, Rojs was expelled from the Croatian Generals Association following an open letter in which he, along with 11 others, questioned the Association's decision to meet with the Generals Society of BiH.

== Honours ==
=== Orders ===
| Award or decoration | Country | Date |
|---|---|---|
| Order of Ante Starčević | Croatia | 24 May 1997 |
