= Batin, Posušje =

Batin
- Village
- Location within Bosnia and Herzegovina
- Coordinates: 43°26′20″N 17°20′34″E
- Country: Bosnia and Herzegovina
- Entity: Federation of Bosnia and Herzegovina
- Canton: West Herzegovina Canton
- Municipality: Posušje

Area
  - Total: 12.90 km^{2} (4.98 sq mi)

Population (2013)
  - Total: 721
  - Density: 55.9/km^{2} (145/sq mi)
- Time zone: UTC+1 (CET)
  - Summer (DST): UTC+2 (CEST)

Batin is a village in the municipality of Posušje in West Herzegovina Canton, the Federation of Bosnia and Herzegovina, Bosnia and Herzegovina.

From Batin comes the famous politician Ljubo Ćesić Rojs and Fra Petar Bakula.

== Demographics ==
According to the 2013 census, its population was 721, all Croats of Bosnia and Herzegovina.

== Bibliography ==
- Ethnicity/National Affiliation, Religion and Mother Tongue (PDF). Sarajevo: Agency for Statistics of Bosnia and Herzegovina. 2019.
