= Gudauri =

Gudauri გუდაური
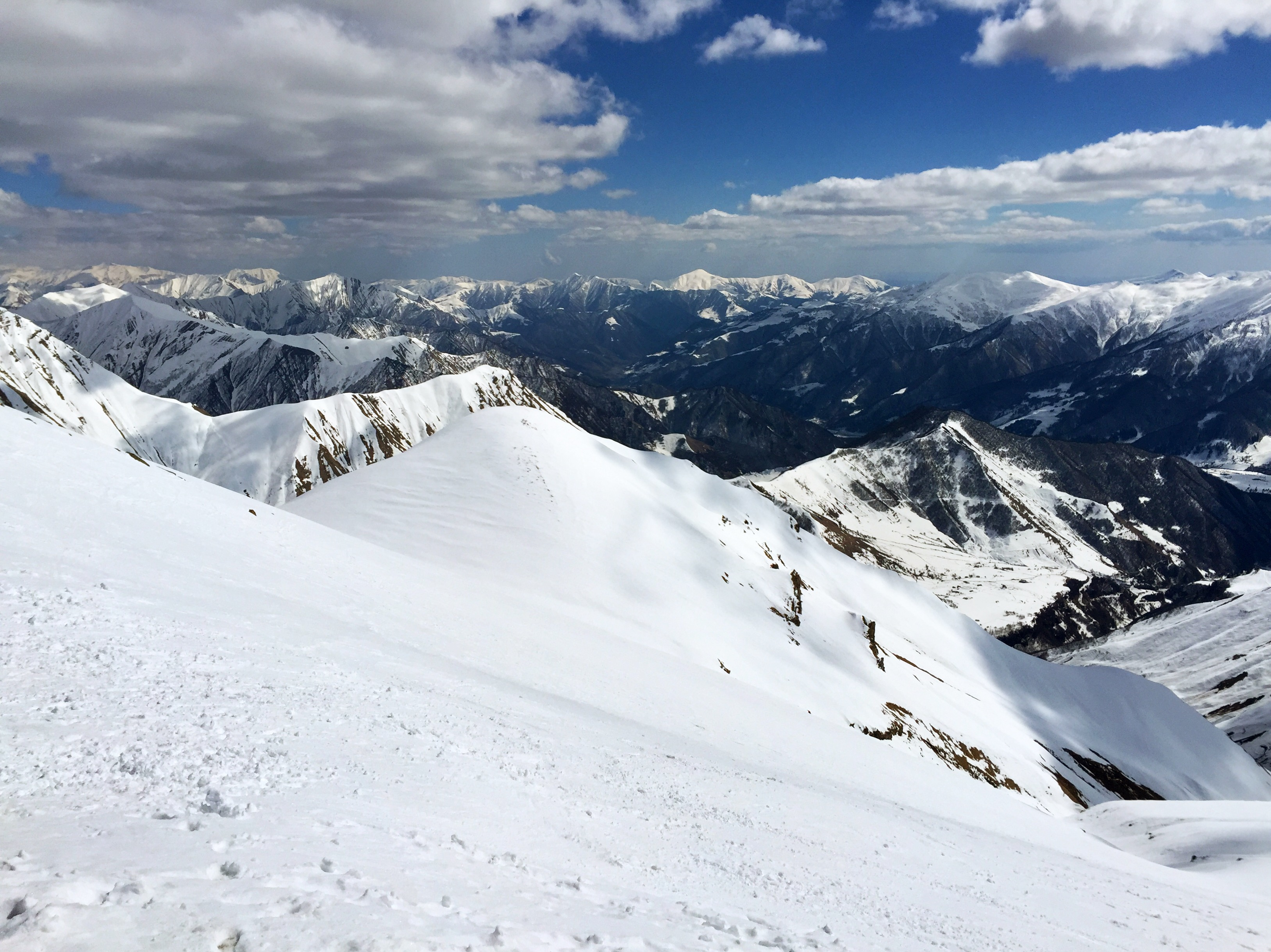
- Gudauri

- Location of Gudauri in Georgia
- Coordinates: 42°28′33″N 44°28′43″E
- Country: Georgia
- Mkhare: Mtskheta-Mtianeti
- Municipality: Kazbegi
- Elevation: 2,196 m (7,205 ft)

Population (2016)
  - Total: 54
- Time zone: UTC+4 (Georgian Time)
- Website: Gudauri Resort

Gudauri (Georgian: გუდაური) is a ski resort in Georgia, located on the south-facing plateau of the Greater Caucasus Mountain Range. The resort is situated in the Kazbegi Municipality, along the Georgian Military Highway near the Jvari Pass, at an elevation of 2,200 meters (7,200 ft.) above sea level.

Gudauri is 120 km (75 mi) to the north of the Georgian capital Tbilisi. The slopes of Gudauri are above the tree line and considered to be avalanche-safe. The ski season lasts from December to April. Heliskiing is available throughout the season.

== Heliski ==
Heliskiing provides skiers with almost unrestricted access to local mountains. Skiers can experience runs at altitudes between 1,500 and 4,200 meters above sea level.

== Ski touring ==
The Gudauri Resort area and Mount Kazbek massif provide options for ski touring.

== Speed riding and paragliding ==
Gudauri is a well known site in the country for speedriding and paragliding. Experienced instructors are employed to accompany customers in the said activities.

== Routes and lifts ==
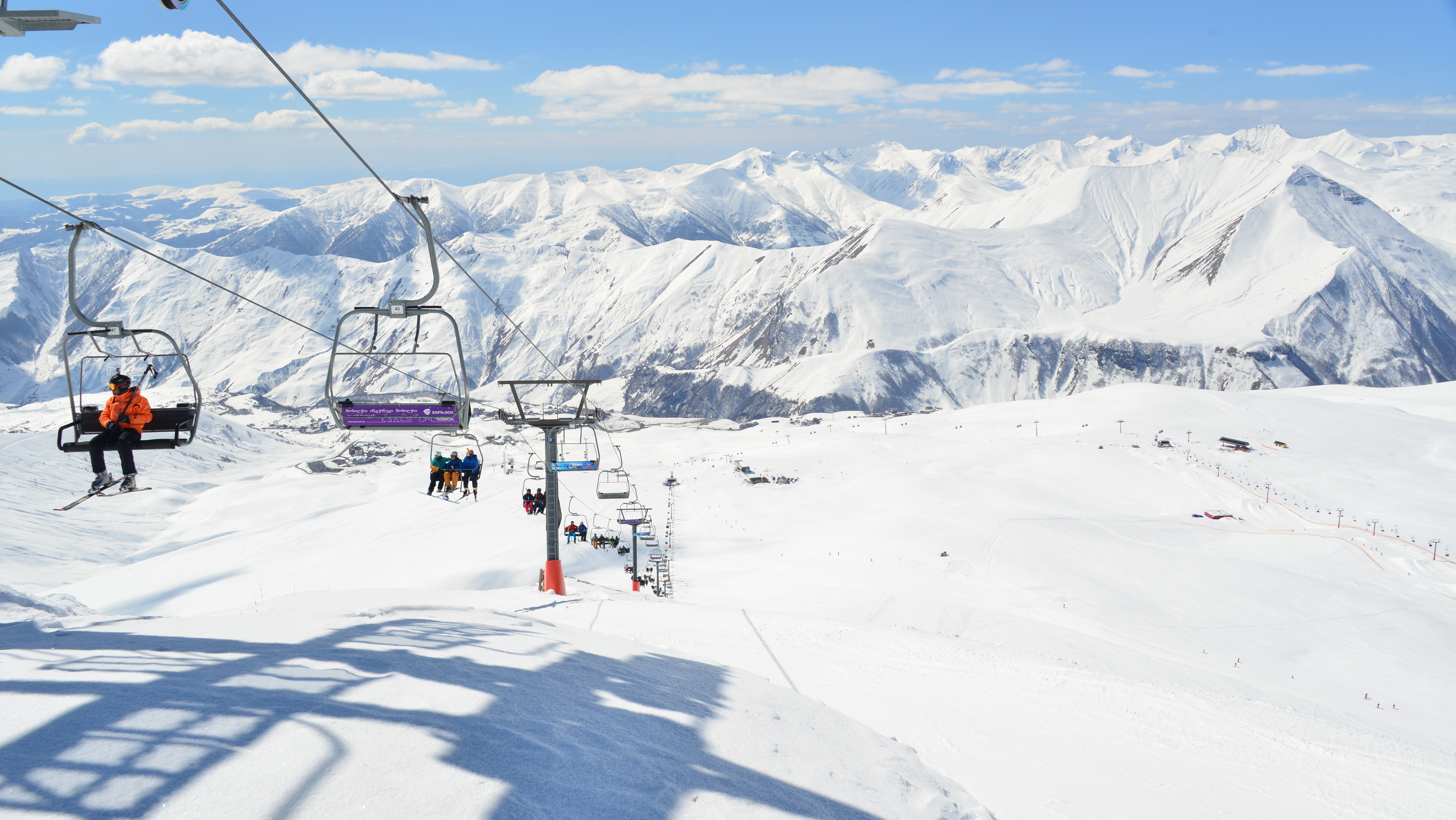
Chairlifts transporting passengers in Gudauri

Gudauri has more than 76 km of ski runs and 18 lifts. The bottommost station of the first ski lift, (Pirveli) is at 1,990 m above sea level and the uppermost station of the last ski lift (Sadzele) is located at 3,279 m. The lifts are made by the Austrian-Swiss manufacturer Doppelmayr. The first lift (Pirveli) is 1,010 m long and a six-seater chairlift, the second (Soliko) is 2,310 m long and a six-seater, and the third (Snow Park) is 1,060 m long and a three-seater. Overall, there is a total of overall 15 ski lifts including Gondola types ("Gudaura" and "Kobi-Gudauri"):

Lift number	Name of lift	Capacity	Notes
1	Pirveli	6 persons	
2	Soliko	6 persons	
3	Kudebi	3 persons	
4	Snow Park	3 persons	
5	Kudebi II	6 persons	
6	Sadzele	4 persons	
7	Zuma	1 person	
8	Gudaura	10 persons	
9	Shino	6 persons	
10	Alpina	1 person	
11	Bombora	1 person	
12	Baby	1 person	
13	Kobi-Gudauri I	10 persons	
14	Kobi-Gudauri II	10 persons	
15	Kobi-Gudauri III	10 persons	

In 2018, chairlifts Kobi-Gudauri 1, 2 and 3 were constructed, measuring a total of 7.5 km, as well as 111 gondola lifts, six stations and the capacity of serving 2800 passengers in an hour. Three new lifts measuring 6 km were added to the resort after December 2023: New Gudaura, Kikilo 1, Kikilo 2. The lifts operate from 10:00 to 16:00, and from 9:00 to 17:00 in the warmer season when the daylight is longer.

== Accidents ==
On 16 March 2018, due to the operator's mistake and design failures, one of the chairlifts (Sadzele) started moving backwards at twice the normal speed, creating a rollback and leaving 11 injured.

On 29 July 2022, a police Mi-8 helicopter crashed while trying to rescue two paragliders in a gorge near Gudauri, killing all eight people on board. One of the two paragliders was also found dead.

On 14 December 2024, 11 Indian workers and 1 Georgian national died of carbon monoxide poisoning at an Indian restaurant in Gudauri. All casualties were employees of the restaurant.

== See also ==
- Bakuriani
