= 2022 Gudauri helicopter crash =

Aviation accident in the country of Georgia

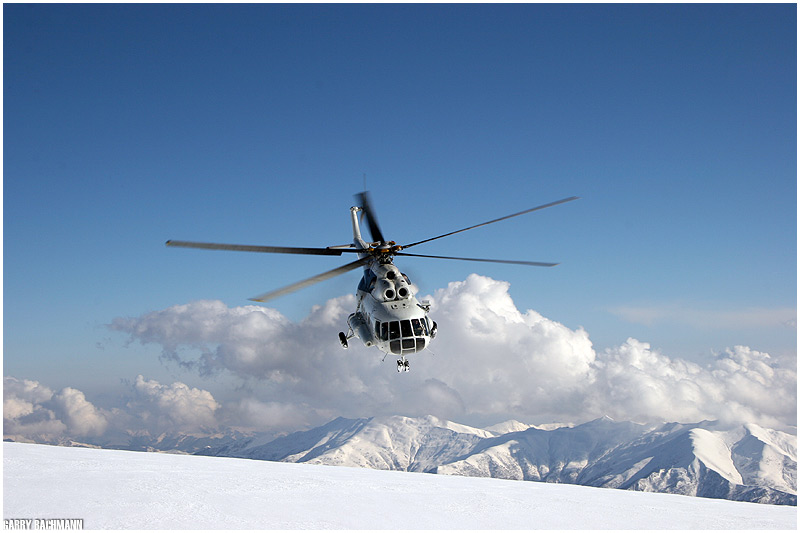
- A Georgian Mi-8 near Gudauri in 2006.

Accident
- Date: 29 July 2022
- Summary: Tail rotor collision resulting in complete loss of control.
- Site: Near Gudauri, Mtskheta-Mtianeti, Georgia
- Total fatalities: 9
- Total injuries: 1

Aircraft
- Aircraft type: Mil Mi-8
- Operator: Border Police of Georgia
- Registration: GBP-10005
- Occupants: 8
- Passengers: 4
- Crew: 4
- Fatalities: 8
- Survivors: 0

Ground casualties
- Ground fatalities: 1
- Ground injuries: 1

On 29 July 2022, a Mil Mi-8 helicopter belonging to the Border Police of Georgia crashed during a rescue mission in a mountainous valley near Gudauri, a Greater Caucasus mountain resort in Georgia's northeast. All eight people on board died, as well as one tourist died in the ravine. Another tour guide survived with injuries.

== Accident ==
On 29 July 2022, a tandem paraglider suffered an accident near Gudauri, with the two occupants falling into a deep rocky gorge. The Border Police of Georgia dispatched a Soviet-designed Mi-8 helicopter—piloted by the veteran officer Colonel Zaza Loria—on a rescue mission. The helicopter lost control while hovering over the gorge and crashed, killing all eight people on board, including four crew members, two emergency physicians, and two rescuers. Subsequently, one of the people paragliding, a foreign tourist, was also found dead; the other, injured, was retrieved by ambulance to safety. According to a police report, a tail rotor failure might have caused the crash.

== Reactions ==
After the crash, the next day was declared a national day of mourning in Georgia. President of Georgia Salome Zourabichvili posthumously awarded the crew, rescuers and first responders with the Medal for Civic Dedication. The accident also reignited a broader discussion about the safety of the paragliding business, which remained largely unregulated at the time of the disaster, and the ability of the Interior Ministry to handle similar incidents with the available equipment and transports.
