= Tribistovo =

- Village
- Location within Bosnia and Herzegovina
- Coordinates: 43°31′39″N 17°21′53″E
- Country: Bosnia and Herzegovina
- Entity: Federation of Bosnia and Herzegovina
- Canton: West Herzegovina Canton
- Municipality: Posušje

Area
  - Total: 27.53 km^{2} (10.63 sq mi)

Population (2013)
  - Total: 178
  - Density: 6.47/km^{2} (16.7/sq mi)
- Time zone: UTC+1 (CET)
  - Summer (DST): UTC+2 (CEST)

Tribistovo is a village in the municipality of Posušje in West Herzegovina Canton, the Federation of Bosnia and Herzegovina, Bosnia and Herzegovina.

Eight people were killed by carbon monoxide poisoning in a cottage in Tribistovo on 1 January 2021, during a New Year's celebration.

== Demographics ==
According to the 2013 census, its population was 178, all Croats.

== Bibliography ==
- Ethnicity/National Affiliation, Religion and Mother Tongue (PDF). Sarajevo: Agency for Statistics of Bosnia and Herzegovina. 2019.
