= Chlorfenapyr =

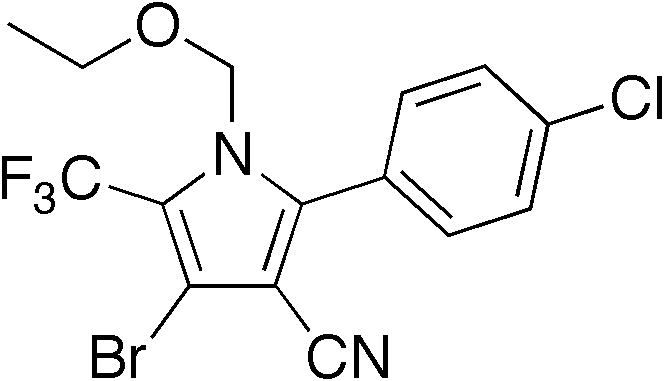

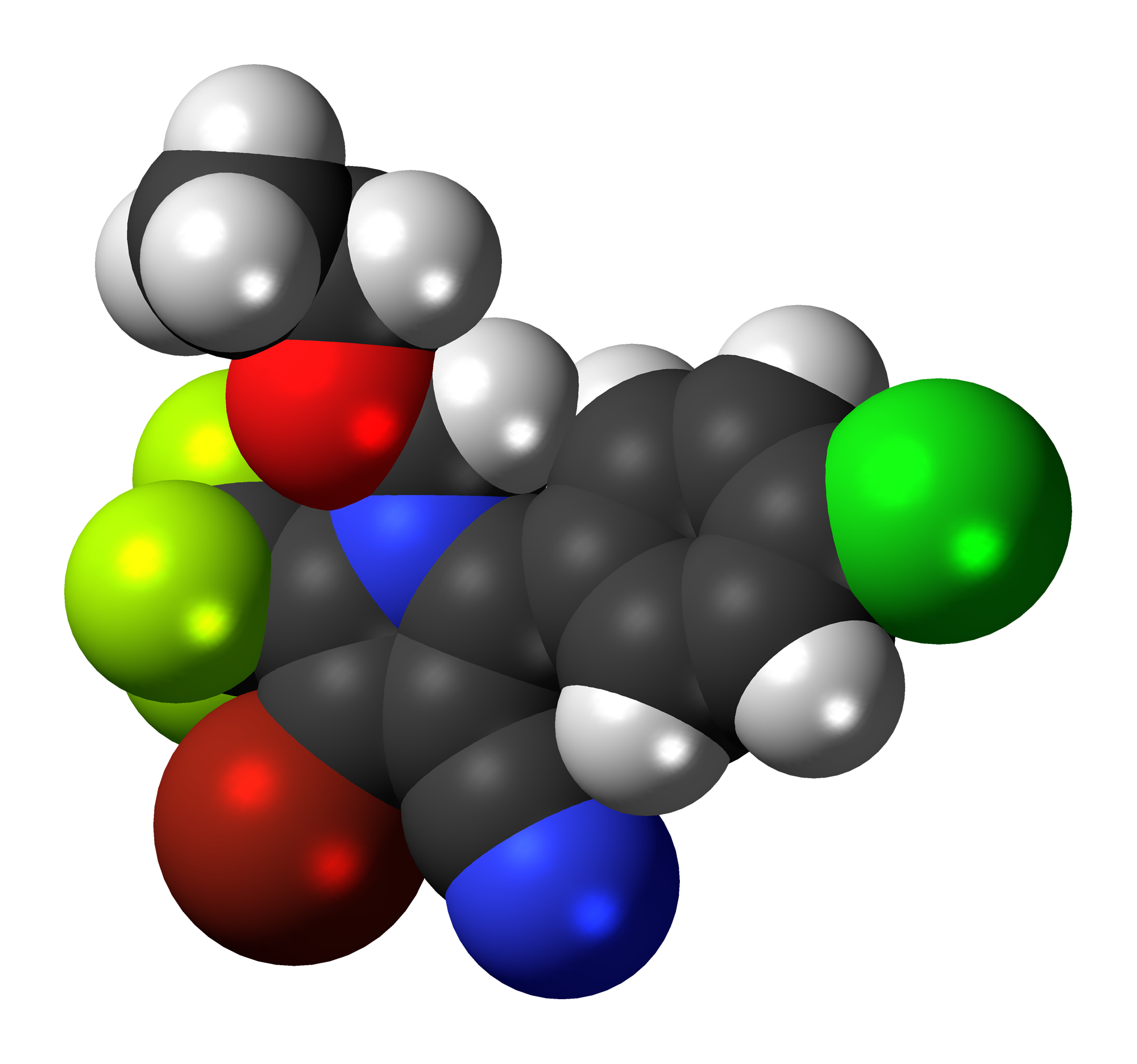

Names
- Preferred IUPAC name 4-Bromo-2-(4-chlorophenyl)-1-(ethoxymethyl)-5-(trifluoromethyl)-1H-pyrrole-3-carbonitrile

Identifiers
| CAS Number | 122453-73-0 |
| 3D model (JSmol) | Interactive image |
| ChEBI | CHEBI:39347 |
| ChEMBL | ChEMBL1869551 |
| ChemSpider | 82875 |
| ECHA InfoCard | 100.116.332 |
| EC Number | 602-782-4 |
| KEGG | C18455 |
| PubChem CID | 91778 |
| UNII | NWI20P05EB |
| CompTox Dashboard (EPA) | DTXSID9032533 |
- InChI: InChI=1/C15H11BrClF3N2O/c1-2-23-8-22-13(9-3-5-10(17)6-4-9)11(7-21)12(16)14(22)15(18,19)20/h3-6H,2,8H2,1H3 Key: CWFOCCVIPCEQCK-UHFFFAOYAO
- SMILES: Clc2ccc(c1c(C#N)c(Br)c(n1COCC)C(F)(F)F)cc2

Properties
| Chemical formula | C_{15}H_{11}BrClF_{3}N_{2}O |
| Molar mass | 407.62 g·mol^{−1} |
| Density | 0.543 g/ml tapped bulk density |
| Melting point | 100 to 101 °C (212 to 214 °F; 373 to 374 K) |

Hazards
- GHS labelling
| Pictograms | (GHS06: Toxic) (GHS07: Exclamation mark) (GHS08: Health hazard) (GHS09: Environmental hazard) |
| Signal word | Danger |
| Hazard statements | H302, H320, H331, H371, H373, H410 |
| Precautionary statements | P260, P264, P270, P271, P273, P301+P312, P304+P340, P305+P351+P338, P309+P311, P311, P314, P321, P330, P337+P313, P391, P403+P233, P405, P501 |
- Except where otherwise noted, data are given for materials in their standard state (at 25 °C [77 °F], 100 kPa). Infobox references

Chlorfenapyr is an insecticide, and specifically a pro-insecticide (meaning it is metabolized into an active insecticide after entering the host).

== History, applications and toxicity ==
Chlorfenapyr was developed by American Cyanamid from the natural bacterial toxin dioxapyrrolomycin, which was first isolated from Streptomyces fumanus.

The United States Environmental Protection Agency initially denied registration in 2000 for use on cotton primarily because of concerns that the insecticide was very toxic to birds and because effective alternatives were available. However, it was registered by the EPA in January, 2001 for use on non-food crops in greenhouses. In 2005, the EPA established a tolerance for residues of chlorfenapyr in or on all food commodities.

Chlorfenapyr is also used as a wool insect-proofing agent, and was introduced as an alternative to synthetic pyrethroids due to a lower toxicity to mammalian and aquatic life.

In April 2016, in Pakistan, 33 people died following the deliberate contamination of a batch of laddu with chlorfenapyr.

== Mode of Action ==
Oxidative removal of the N-ethoxymethyl group of chlorfenapyr by mixed function oxidases forms a compound known as Tralopyril or CL 303268. This active metabolite uncouples oxidative phosphorylation at the mitochondria, resulting in disruption of production of ATP, cellular death, and ultimately organism mortality.

Chlorfenapyr is in IRAC group 13.
