= 1998 Delhi oil poisoning =

Food safety incident in Delhi, India

In 1998, adulterated mustard oil poisoning in Delhi resulted in widespread dropsy and deaths of 60 people and illness of more than 3000. It was revealed that white oil, a petroleum product, was mixed with edible mustard oil. Sale of mustard in loose quantity was banned by a court order, to prevent more health hazards. In September 1998, the ban on packed mustard oil was removed after a Cabinet decision with a condition that the date of packing should be prominently displayed. Even though mustard oil is banned as an edible oil in countries like USA, Canada and EU due to its erucic acid content, the oil is widely used as an edible oil in North India, Pakistan and Nepal.

== Legal action ==
In 1998, the Prevention of Food Adulteration Department booked one trader for adulteration of mustard oil. After a prolonged legal battle, the trader was found guilty and in 2008, was sentenced to two years imprisonment and a ₹5,000 fine.
