= 2024 Laos methanol poisoning =

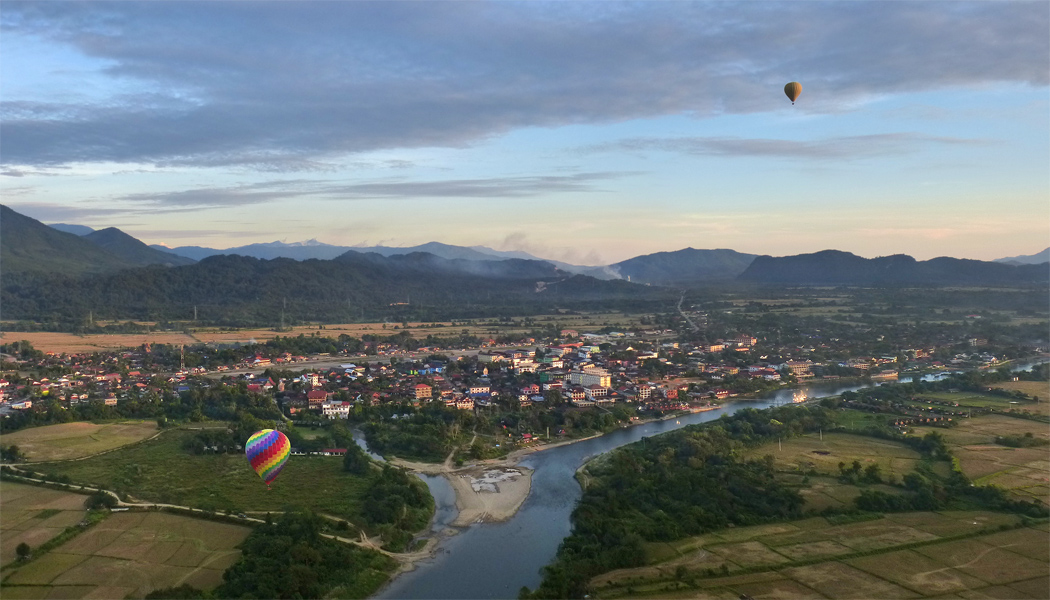
- Vang Vieng in 2013
- Date: 13 November 2024
- Location: Nana Backpacker Hostel, Vang Vieng, Laos
- Cause: Methanol poisoning (assumed)
- Deaths: 6
- Injuries: At least 8

In November 2024, six people died from suspected methanol poisoning at a bar in Vang Vieng, Laos, as a result of consuming contaminated alcohol. At least six others were hospitalised.

Authorities linked the poisoning to the illicit production of alcohol containing methanol, a toxic substance. Following the event, the implicated hostel deactivated its online presence and ceased accepting bookings. Methanol poisoning incidents in Southeast Asia have raised concerns about safety regulations and enforcement in tourist hubs.

The owner of Nana Hostel, Duong Van Huan, stated that he never added methanol to the drinks at the bar, and that the local police checked alcohol at the hostel and its suppliers. The hostel manager denied responsibility and was taken in by police for questioning on 21 November.

== Background ==
Methanol can be illegally added to alcohol to increase its volume as a cheaper alternative, usually in countries with weak liquor laws. It is not a significant product of beverage alcohol production by natural fermentation on any scale. Rather, human poisonings are caused by an admixture of industrially produced methanol. While it can make individuals feel inebriated, methanol is not for human consumption because of its toxicity, but it is indistinguishable from ethanol, the substance which makes a drink alcoholic. Methanol poisoning can cause nausea, vomiting, and heart or respiratory failure. As little as 30 millilitres or one ounce can be lethal.

Outbreaks of methanol poisoning occur every year with thousands of people affected, mostly in Asia with people drinking bootlegged liquor or homemade alcohol. In 2023, 11 people had died and hundreds of others taken ill due to locally made coconut wine in the Philippines, and in 2019, more than 150 people were killed and 200 others hospitalised in northern India after drinking unregulated moonshine.

Laos is a poor landlocked country in Southeast Asia that is a popular tourist destination, specifically amongst backpackers seeking partying and adventure sports. Vang Vieng is a rural town in northern Laos known for excessive drinking, the easy availability of drugs, and river tubing. In 2012, the government shut multiple bars and activities in an attempt to reinvent the area as an eco-paradise and adventure travel hub, although its party history has remained.

== Incident ==
Information about what specifically happened was severely limited as Laos is a one-party communist state that has no organised opposition and limits information. The Foreign Ministry has refused to comment, and at the hospital in Vang Vieng where victims were treated, both management and local officials refused to comment to reporters.

The two Australian victims, both 19 years old, initially fell ill on 13 November, after a night of drinking with a group of others. According to the manager of the Nana Backpacker Hostel, the victims had joined other guests on 11 November, for free shots of Laotian vodka offered by the hostel before going elsewhere and returning in the early morning.

The two female Danish victims, 20 and 21 years old, were both discovered unconscious on the bathroom floor on 13 November, at 6 pm, and died that night of heart failure in a hospital in Vientiane. According to a friend, they last texted they had been vomiting blood for hours.

The American victim, 57 years old, was found dead in his bed the same day, with several empty glasses around his bed.

== Victims ==
Nationality	Deaths
Australia	2
Denmark	2
United States	1
United Kingdom	1
Total	6

At least six people from four different countries were killed by the suspected methanol tainted drinks with eight others sickened from consuming it.

Holly Bowles and Bianca Jones, both 19 years old and from the Beaumaris area in Melbourne, Australia were staying at the Nana Hostel in Vang Vieng. The pair went out drinking at a nearby bar on 12 November 2024 and were taken to a hospital in Vientiane the following morning. Bowles was taken to the Bangkok Hospital in Thailand where she was put on life support. Jones was taken to the Udon Thani Hospital in Thailand, where she died on 21 November 2024. Bowles died a day later.

On 21 November 2024, 28-year-old Simone White, a lawyer from southeast London, died from the poisoning. As many as six British nationals were reported to be hospitalised. Danish authorities confirmed that two Danish women aged 19 and 20 died from the incident but have not shared further information due to privacy concerns. The US State Department confirmed the death of an American man but has not provided further details about his identity.

== Reaction ==
The Laotian government said it was conducting investigations into the incident and expressed condolences to the families of the victims. Eleven employees of the Nana Backpacker Hostel were subsequently arrested, including its manager. On 1 December, it was reported that the Laotian government prohibited the sale or consumption of Tiger Vodka and Tiger Whisky, believed to be source of the poisonings; it also ordered the closure of its factory, and arrested its owner.

=== Australia ===
Australian Prime Minister Anthony Albanese addressed the Australian parliament stating "This is every parent's very worst fear and a nightmare that no one should have to endure... we also take this moment to say that we're thinking of Bianca's friend Holly Bowles who is fighting for her life". The Australian Foreign Affairs department issued an advisory indicating that many Australians had gotten methanol poisoning from consuming alcoholic drinks in Laos, and that travellers should be aware and wary of the risks with spirit-based drinks, including cocktails. On 29 November, the ministry updated its travel advisory in Laos to specify against drinking Tiger Vodka and Tiger Whisky. On 6 February 2025, the Australian government said that offers of assistance from the Australian Federal Police have not been taken up by the Laotian authorities. In an interview with The Guardian published on 15 March, the families of Bowles and Jones said they tried to arrange a meeting with Laos' ambassador to Australia with the help of the Australian government, but have received no response. The Guardian also revealed that the foreign ministries of Australia, Denmark and the UK mounted a joint diplomatic push with Laos' ministry of foreign affairs.

=== United Kingdom ===
On 21 November, the UK's Foreign, Commonwealth and Development Office said in a statement that it was supporting the family of a British woman who died and was in contact with local officials in Laos. It also updated the UK's travel advice for Laos to reflect the dangers of methanol poisoning.

=== United States ===
The US Department of State issued a health alert to Americans travelling in Laos over the incident.

== See also ==
- List of methanol poisoning incidents
