= 1971 Iraq poison grain disaster =

Incident of mass poisoning in Iraq in 1971

A sack of "pink grain". Note the labelling in Spanish, and the grain's distinctive orange-pink colour.

The 1971 Iraq poison grain disaster was a mass methylmercury poisoning incident where seed grain treated with a methylmercury fungicide, which was never intended for human consumption, was imported into Iraq from Mexico and the United States. Due to factors like foreign-language labeling and distribution too late into the growing cycle, this toxic grain was consumed as food by Iraqi residents in rural areas of the country. Sufferers experienced paresthesia (numbness of skin), ataxia (lack of coordination of muscle movements) and vision loss, symptoms similar to those observed in Minamata disease-affected Japan. Though the official death toll was 459, figures of as much as ten times greater have been suggested. When it occurred in 1971, the poisoning was the largest mercury poisoning event in history, with cases peaking in February 1972 and stopping by the end of March.

Reports after the disaster recommended tighter regulation, better labelling and handling of mercury-treated grain, and wider involvement of the World Health Organization in monitoring and preventing poisoning incidents. Investigation confirmed the particular danger posed to fetuses and young children.

== Context ==
Mercury was found to be an effective fungicide in the early 1900s, but its popularity resulted in several poisoning events due to its toxicity. Mercury compounds were used from 1949 onwards as seed dressings to protect seeds from fungal and insect attack. Seed dressings are supposed not to leave harmful residues in harvested cereal crops.

Methylmercury was banned in Sweden in 1966, the first country to do so, and the United Kingdom followed in 1971. Previous mercury-poisoning incidents had occurred in Iraq in 1956 and 1960. In 1956, there had been around 200 cases, and 70 deaths; in 1960 there had been 1000 cases and 200 deaths, in both cases due to ethylmercury compounds. Among the recommendations made after the 1960 incident had been to colour any toxic grain for easy identification. Before the 1971 incident, around 200–300 cases of methylmercury poisoning had been reported worldwide. Drought had reduced harvests in 1969, affecting 500,000 people, and in 1970.

== Causes ==
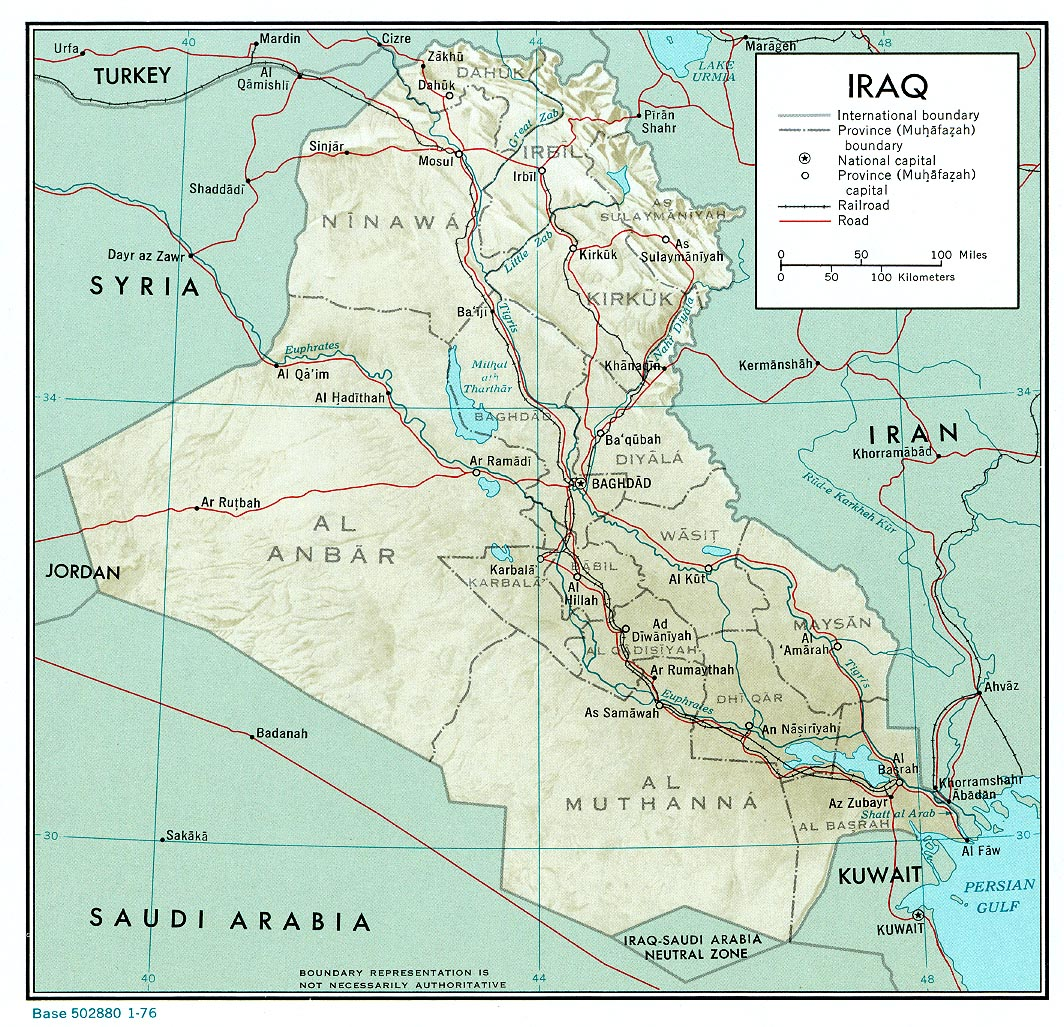
A map of Iraq (1976) showing the provinces referred to.

Some 95,000 tonnes (93,000 long tons; 105,000 short tons) of grain (73,202 tonnes of wheat grain and 22,262 tonnes of barley), coloured a pink-orange hue, were shipped to Iraq from the United States and Mexico. The wheat arrived in Basra on SS Trade Carrier between 16 September and 15 October, the barley between 22 October and 24 November 1971. Iraq's government chose Mexipak, a high-yield wheat seed developed in Mexico by Norman Borlaug. The seeds contained an average of 7.9 μg/g of mercury, with some samples containing up to nearly twice that. The three northern governorates of Nineveh, Kirkuk and Erbil received more than half the shipments. Contributing factors to the epidemic included the fact that distribution started late, and much grain arrived after the October–November planting season.

Farmers were supposed to plant the poisoned grain, but many instead offered it to their families as food, since their own planting had been completed. Distribution was, in later stages hurried and open, with grain being distributed free of charge with the expectation of payment in kind when the harvest season came. Some farmers even sold off their own grain, in order to claim more of the imported grain. This left them dependent on tainted grain for the winter. Many Iraqis were either unaware of the significant health risk posed, or chose to ignore the warnings. Initially, farmers were to certify with a thumbprint or signature that they understood the grain was poison, however some distributors ignored this requirement. Warnings on the sacks were in Spanish and English, not at all understood, or included the black-and-white skull and crossbones design, which meant nothing to Iraqis. The long, asymptomatic latent period of mercury poisoning may have granted farmers a false sense of security when animals fed the grain initially appeared to be fine. The red dye washed off the grain; the mercury did not. Hence, washing may have given only the appearance of removing the poison.

The Iraqi government made limited attempts to control the distribution of the mercury grain. Four high-ranking officials were posted at the Basra docks during the first two weeks of unloading. However, control of the unloading process slipped afterwards, with some spilt grain being stolen by dockworkers. Aircraft were used to drop half a million leaflets warning of the mercury, however this was an insufficient quantity for the population at the time.

Mercury was ingested through the consumption of homemade bread, meat and other animal products obtained from livestock given treated barley, vegetables grown from soil contaminated with mercury, game birds that had fed on the grain and fish caught in rivers, canals, and lakes into which treated grain had been dumped by farmers. Ground seed dust inhalation was a contributing factor in farmers during sowing and grinding. Consumption of ground grain in homemade bread is thought to have been the major source of toxicity, since no cases were reported in urban areas, where government flour supplies were commercially regulated.

== Symptoms, outbreak and treatment ==
The effect of mercury took some time – the latent period between ingestion and the first symptoms (typically paresthesia – numbness in the extremities) was between 16 and 38 days. Paresthesia was the predominant symptom in less serious cases. Worse cases included ataxia (typically loss of balance), blindness or reduced vision, and death resulting from central nervous system failure. Anywhere between 20 and 40 mg of mercury has been suggested as sufficient for paresthesia (between 0.5 and 0.8 mg/kg of body weight). On average, individuals affected consumed 20 kg or so of bread; the 73,000 tonnes provided would have been sufficient for over 3 million cases.

The hospital in Kirkuk received large numbers of patients with symptoms that doctors recognised from the 1960 outbreak. The first case of alkylmercury poisoning was admitted to hospital on 21 December. By 26 December, the hospital had issued a specific warning to the government. By January 1972, the government had started to strongly warn the populace against eating the grain, although dispatches did not mention the large numbers already ill. The Iraqi Army soon ordered disposal of the grain and eventually declared anyone found selling it would receive the death penalty. Farmers dumped their supplies wherever possible, contaminating the water supply (particularly the Tigris). The government initiated a news blackout and released little information about the outbreak.

The World Health Organization assisted the Iraqi government through the supply of drugs, analytical equipment and expertise. Many new treatments were tried, since existing methods for heavy metal poisoning were not particularly effective. Dimercaprol was administered to several patients, but caused rapid deterioration of their condition. It was ruled out as a treatment for this sort of poisoning following the outbreak. Polythiol resins, penicillamine and dimercaprol sulfonate all helped, but are believed to have been largely insignificant in overall recovery and outcomes. Dialysis was tested on a few patients late in the treatment period, but they showed no clinical improvement. The result of all treatments was varied, with some patients' blood mercury level being dramatically reduced, but a negligible effect in others. All patients received periods of treatment interspersed with lay periods; continuous treatment was suggested in future cases. Later treatment was less effective in reducing blood toxicity.

== Effects ==
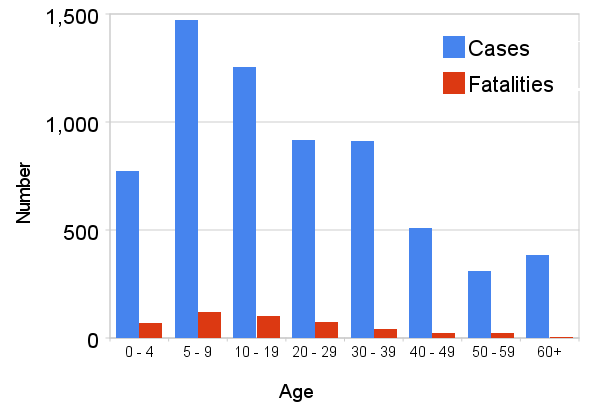
Incidence of cases and fatalities, by age group

6,530 patients were admitted to hospitals with poisoning, and 459 deaths were reported. Cases reached a peak of hundreds per day in January, and had largely subsided by the beginning of March. The last admittance was on 27 March. Admissions represented every age and gender stratum, although those under the age of ten represented a third of admitted cases. This number is "certainly an underestimate", because of the availability of hospital treatment, hospital overcrowding and lack of faith in treatment. In the most severely affected areas, prevalence was 28% and mortality was 21% of the cases. Some Iraqi doctors believe both the number of cases and fatalities are at least ten times too low, with perhaps 100,000 cases of brain damage. One suggested reason for the vast discrepancy between reported and estimated numbers of deaths is the Iraqi custom, common to large parts of the Middle East, for a person to die at home when possible. Home deaths would not have been recorded.

A large number of patients with minor symptoms recovered completely; those with more serious symptoms improved. This was in contrast to expected outcomes, largely based on analysis of Minamata disease in Japan. In boys with mercury levels below clinical poisoning, a reduction in school performance was noted, although this correlation could not be confirmed. In infants, the mercury poisoning caused central nervous system damage. Relatively low doses caused slower development in children, and abnormal reflexes. Different treatments for mercury poisoning have since been developed, and "quiet baby syndrome", characterised by a baby who never cries, is now a recognised symptom of methylmercury-induced brain damage. Ongoing recommendations of the food regulation authorities have focused on consumption by pregnant women and infant children, noting the particular susceptibility of fetuses and infants to methylmercury poisoning. Data from Iraq have confirmed that methylmercury can pass to a child in utero, and mercury levels were equal to or higher in the newborn child than in the mother.

In 1974, a joint Food and Agriculture Organization (FAO) and World Health Organization (WHO) meeting made several recommendations to prevent a similar outbreak. These included stressing the importance of labelling bags in the local language and with locally understood warning symbols. The possibility of an additive creating a strong bitter taste was studied. The meeting urged governments to strictly regulate methyl- and ethylmercury use in their respective countries, including limiting use to where no other reasonable alternative was available. It also recommended the involvement of the FAO and WHO in assisting national governments in regulation and enforcement, and the setting up of national poison control centres. Over 9–13 November, a Conference on Intoxication due to Alkylmercury-Treated Seed was held in Baghdad. It supported the recommendations of the FAO/WHO report and suggested that local and national media should publicise outbreaks, including size and symptoms; it considered the distribution of this information crucial. It also laid out a general plan as to the collection of relevant information from the field and potential analysis for further investigation. It called on national governments to make use of WHO involvement whenever feasible, and absolved world governments in clear terms, saying that "No country should ever feel that any blame will attach to it for allowing an outbreak to occur".

== See also ==
- Minamata disease
