= Vrpolje, Posušje =

Vrpolje
- Village
- Location within Bosnia and Herzegovina
- Coordinates: 43°33′03″N 17°23′43″E
- Country: Bosnia and Herzegovina
- Entity: Federation of Bosnia and Herzegovina
- Canton: West Herzegovina Canton
- Municipality: Posušje

Area
  - Total: 28.66 km^{2} (11.07 sq mi)

Population (2013)
  - Total: 919
  - Density: 32.1/km^{2} (83.0/sq mi)
- Time zone: UTC+1 (CET)
  - Summer (DST): UTC+2 (CEST)

Vrpolje is a village in the municipality of Posušje in West Herzegovina Canton, the Federation of Bosnia and Herzegovina, Bosnia and Herzegovina.

== Demographics ==
According to the 2013 census, its population was 919.

Ethnicity in 2013
Ethnicity	Number	Percentage
Croats	916	99.7%
other/undeclared	3	0.3%
Total	919	100%

== Bibliography ==
- Ethnicity/National Affiliation, Religion and Mother Tongue (PDF). Sarajevo: Agency for Statistics of Bosnia and Herzegovina. 2019.
