= Yushō disease =

Mass poisoning in Japan

Diagram of deodorization tower The PCB that was used as the heating medium leaked from the pipes and mixed into the rice bran oil.

Yushō disease (油症; lit. 'oil symptoms') was a mass poisoning by polychlorinated biphenyls (PCBs) which occurred in northern Kyūshū, Japan, in 1968. In January 1968, rice bran oil produced by Kanemi Company in Kyushu was contaminated with PCBs and polychlorinated dibenzofurans (PCDFs) during production. For deodorization, the oil was heated using PCB as the heating medium, circulating through pipes. Due to holes in the pipes, the PCB leaked into the rice bran oil. The contaminated rice bran oil was then sold to poultry farmers for use as a feed supplement and to consumers for use in cooking. In February to March 1968, farmers started reporting that their poultry were dying due to apparent difficulty in breathing; altogether 400,000 birds died. About 14,000 people who had consumed the contaminated rice oil were affected in Japan. More than 500 died. Common symptoms included dermal and ocular lesions, and a lowered immune response. Other symptoms included fatigue, headache, cough, and unusual skin sores. Additionally, in children, there were reports of poor cognitive development.

Although a decade had passed, an almost identical case occurred in Taiwan in 1979. Again, rice oil had been heated by pipes that leaked. On this occasion, the condition there was known as Yu-cheng disease (Chinese: 油症; pinyin: yóuzhèng; Wade–Giles: Yu^{2} cheng^{4}). Similar symptoms and effects of the PCBs and PCDFs were shown, especially in children.

There have been studies undertaken on animals to understand the mechanisms of PCBs and PCDFs and their effects. Scientists discovered that low levels of PCBs could kill fish and other wildlife and as such their use in manufacturing was reduced.

== See also ==
- Kobayashi red yeast rice scandal
- Four Big Pollution Diseases of Japan
- 2008 Irish pork crisis
- Seveso disaster
