= 2016 Layyah sweet poisoning =

Mass poisoning in Pakistan

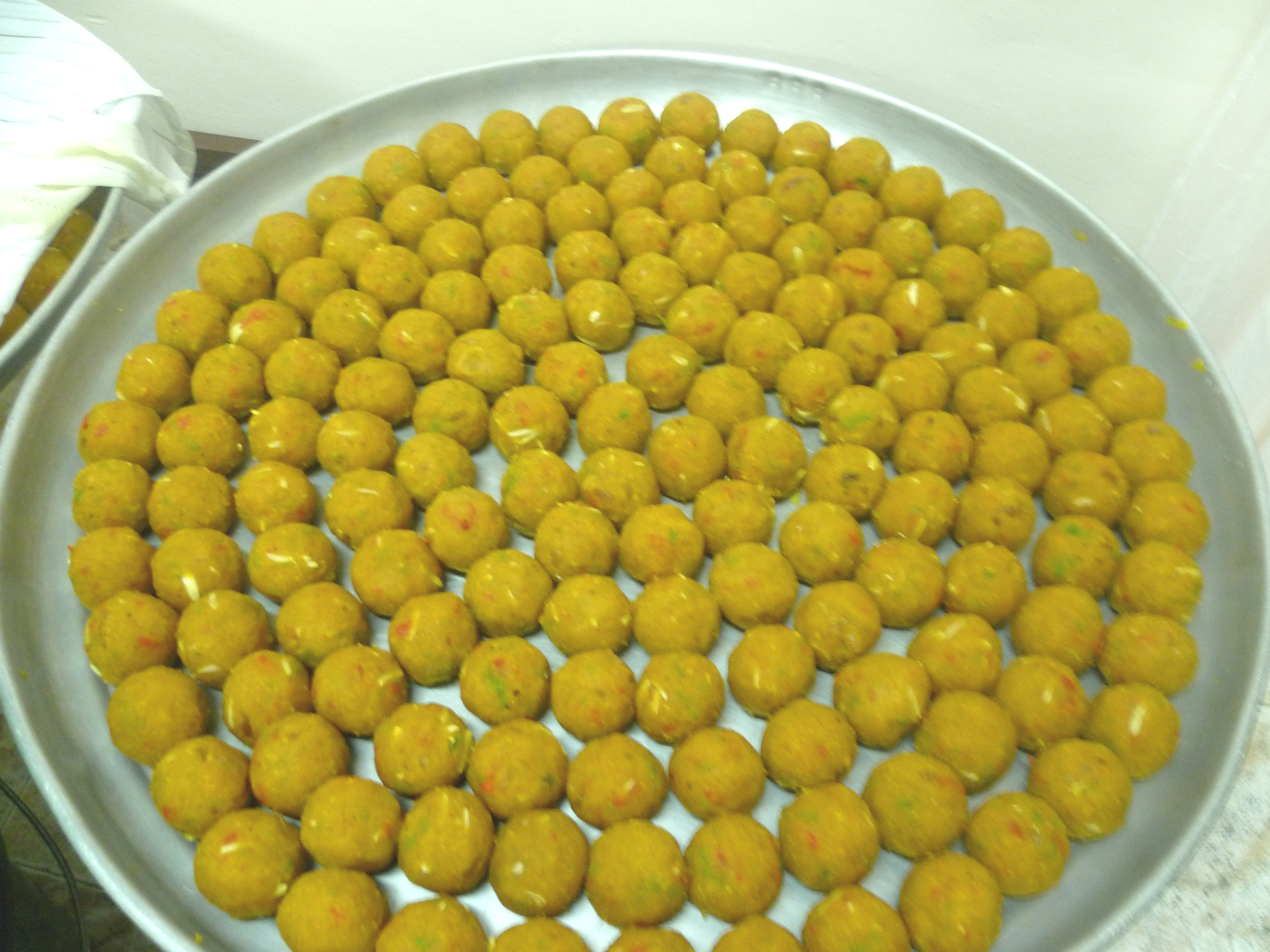
A plate of laddu

From 20 April to 8 May 2016, at least 33 people, including five children, died in District Layyah, Punjab, Pakistan, after eating purposely poisoned laddu, a baked confection. Testing of the confectioneries revealed they were laced with the highly toxic insecticide chlorfenapyr. A sweet shop owner, Khalid Mahmood, confessed to mixing the pesticide into the sweets after an argument with his brother and co-owner.

A pesticide shop, close by the bakery where the sweets were bought, was being renovated, and the owner had left his products at the bakery for safekeeping, allowing Mahmood access to the substance.

A man bought 5 kg of laddu for the celebration of a newborn on 17 April. At least 50 people consumed the sweets, and ten of them died the same day. On 25 April, the death toll rose to 23, with 52 people still being treated at various hospitals. On 1 May the death toll rose to 33 with 13 people in hospital. In one case, a baby lost his father, six uncles, and one aunt.

== Aftermath ==
Two shop owners and one worker were initially arrested. Two weeks later the police announced that Mahmood had confessed.

The Prime Minister, Nawaz Sharif, stated that the incident would be thoroughly investigated, and ordered the police to find and take action against the responsible people.

The Chief Minister of Punjab, Shehbaz Sharif, visited Layyah on 2 May, and expressed his condolences and regrets for the loss of life.

== See also ==
- 2012 Pakistan fake medicine crisis
- 1858 Bradford sweets poisoning
