= Diluent =

Substance which decreases the viscosity or concentration of fluids

A diluent (also referred to as a filler, dilutant or thinner) is a diluting agent. Certain fluids are too viscous to be pumped easily or too dense to flow from one particular point to the other. This can be troublesome, because it might not be economically feasible to transport such fluids in this state. To ease this restricted movement, diluents are added. This decreases the viscosity of the fluids, thereby also decreasing the pumping/transportation costs.

One industrial application is the transport of crude oil via pipelines. Heavy crude oil/bitumen are fluids with high viscosity, especially at low temperatures. The addition of a diluent enables the diluted fluid (dilbit in the case of bitumen) to meet pipeline specifications in order for it to be efficiently transported. Typical diluent in this case is naphtha or condensate.

Types of diluents more familiar to the general public include paint thinner and nail polish thinner, both of which improve the consistency and applicability of the products to which they are added. Diluent is also used as a term in solvent extraction for an inert solvent in which a metal extraction agent (extractant) is dissolved. In solvent extraction the diluent has potentially several uses. It can be used as a solvent (in the purely chemical sense rather than the solvent extraction sense) to dissolve an extractant which is a solid and so render it suitable for use in a liquid–liquid extraction process. In other cases such as PUREX nuclear reprocessing the diluent (kerosene) is used to reduce the maximum metal loading which the organic layer can reach. If the organic layer was to acquire too much metal then a solid metal complex might form, or more worryingly in a nuclear process the potential for a criticality accident if the fissile metal concentration in the organic phase becomes too high. Commonly in both lab and industrial solvent extraction of metals petroleum kerosene is used as a diluent, but in recent times it has been shown that Neste's second generation biodiesel which was formed by hydrodeoxygenation can be used as a diluent.

Water is probably the most common and familiar diluent, but many substances, such as oils, do not dissolve well in water and therefore require different diluents to be diluted effectively without separating into parts.

== Medications ==
Diluents are also very important in the pharmaceutical industry. They are inactive ingredients that are added to tablets and capsules in addition to the active drug. For example, a Tylenol 325 mg tablet does not weigh 325 mg. This is the weight of the active acetaminophen, while the tablet weighs more due to other additives known as diluents. These additives may be used as binders, disintegrants (help the tablet break apart in the digestive system), or flavor enhancers. Some very common diluents in tablets include starch, cellulose derivatives, and magnesium stearate (a lubricant). (See also Excipient.)

Diluents are also used in vaccines such as MMR to reconstitute the vaccine after storage.

== Breathing gas ==
In underwater diving a diluent gas is generally used to reduce the oxygen fraction of the breathing gas to a non-toxic level appropriate to the ambient pressure at which it is to be breathed. Diluent gases for this use are metabolically inert and non-toxic, but may have some level of narcotic effect at high partial pressure. The commonly used diluents for breathing gases are nitrogen, provided in the form of air, and helium, provided as heliox, or both nitrogen and helium together as trimix. The diluent used in scuba rebreathers contains enough oxygen to support life as it is also used as a bailout gas.

Helium is also useful as a breathing gas diluent to reduce work of breathing of gases, both at high ambient pressures, and for medical purposes, but it is an expensive gas, which limits its utility.

== Drugs ==
The 1985 diethylene glycol wine scandal was an incident in which several Austrian wineries illegally adulterated their wines using the toxic substance diethylene glycol (a primary ingredient in some brands of antifreeze) to make the wines appear sweeter and more full-bodied in the style of late harvest wines.
