= List of medicine contamination incidents =

In medicinal chemistry, the term "contamination" is used to describe harmful intrusions, such as the presence of toxins or pathogens in pharmaceutical drugs.

== List ==
The following list encompasses notable medicine contamination and adulteration incidents.

- 1937 — Elixir sulfanilamide incident: S. E. Massengill Company used diethylene glycol as the solvent for the antibacterial sulfanilamide, causing 107 deaths and leading to the 1938 passage of the Federal Food, Drug, and Cosmetic Act.
- 1942 — Nose droppers used to administer ephedrine and neosynephrin solutions to multiple members of the same household were found to be contaminated by users to the detriment of subsequent users. Bacterial growth was found in all solutions that were examined.
- 1970s-1985 — Treatments for hemophilia derived from human blood were contaminated with HIV and hepatitis C and infected over 10,000 patients worldwide with HIV and over 60,000 patients with Hepatitis C. The manufacturers of the affected products became aware of the contamination but continued to sell it. After the contaminated products were banned in many developed countries, sales were shifted to Asia and Latin America.
- 1982 Chicago Tylenol murders: Tylenol pain-relief capsules were laced with potassium cyanide, leading to seven deaths.
- 2006-2007 — Toxic cough syrup in Panama: Pharmaceutical manufacturers used diethylene glycol, which they believed to be glycerine, to make cough syrup.
- 2007 — Panamanian Eduardo Arias discovered that toothpaste sold in his country was labeled as containing diethylene glycol, the same ingredient that had tainted cough syrup and killed 138 Panamanians in 2006. Panamanian officials discovered that the toothpaste had come from China and initiated a global response. Also in May 2007, the same toothpaste was found in some Costa Rican stores. Fast action by the Ministry of Health, and notification through the media, prevented poisonings due to this product. This event was linked to the death sentence of a former pharmaceuticals control officer in China, as the Costa Rican newspaper La Nación reported on its issue of May 30. On June 4, 2007, a press release by the Chinese Foreign Ministry cited an earlier study in China which concluded that up to 15.6% diethylene glycol in toothpaste is safe. In June 2007, counterfeit Colgate toothpaste imported from China was found to be contaminated with DEG, and several people in the eastern US reported experiencing headaches and pain after using the product. The same occurred in Spain with a false Colgate toothpaste, which contained 6% DEG. The tainted products could be identified by the claim to be manufactured in South Africa by Colgate-Palmolive South Africa Ltd; they were 5 oz/100 ml tubes (a size which Colgate does not sell in the United States) and their packaging contained numerous misspellings on the labels. Colgate-Palmolive claimed it does not import products from South Africa into the United States or Canada and that DEG is never and was never used in any of its products anywhere in the world. These counterfeit products were found in smaller mom and pop stores, dollar stores, and discount stores in at least four states. In July 2007, diethylene glycol was found in counterfeit Sensodyne toothpaste, on sale at a car boot sale in Derbyshire, England.
- 2008 Chinese heparin adulteration resulting in 81 deaths.
- 2009 — 84 Nigerian children were reported to have died after being given "My Pikin", a teething syrup contaminated with diethylene glycol.
- 2012 — As of 2 November 2012 in the New England Compounding Center meningitis outbreak, 753 cases of fungal infection occurred with 64 deaths due to contaminated injectable medication.
- 2012 Pakistan fake medicine crisis
- 2017 — Medical cannabis in California found to contain dangerous bacteria and fungi, causing at least one fatality.
- 2012 – 2018 — From 2012 to 2018, massive amounts of generic versions of an entire class of angiotensin II inhibitor hypertension medications (popularly known by their common drug name suffix "sartan") were made with a contaminated ingredient obtained from a manufacturer in China. Patients receiving these drugs were exposed to genotoxic and carcinogenic N-nitrosodimethylamine (NDMA) and N-nitrosodiethylamine (NDEA), which cause genetic damage and cancer, from 2012 until the drugs were recalled from the world drug market in 2018. The problem began in 2012, when the process for making tetrazole, a chemical intermediate in the production of sartans, was changed by generic drug manufacturers in favor of cheaper and more efficient processes. These changes caused drugs made with tetrazole to be contaminated with NDMA and NDEA. The contamination was not detected until 2018. According to medicinal chemist and pharmaceutical industry blogger Dr. Derek Lowe, generic drug manufacturers often change the way in which prescription drug ingredients are made in order to reduce costs, so this kind of contamination may be more widespread and undetected in generic drugs.
- 2019-2021 — low levels of NDMA were found by the US FDA in metformin, leading to voluntary recalls by nine companies.
- 2020 — NDMA was found in ranitidine, leading to a US FDA recall.
- 2021 — NDMA was found in metformin, leading to a recall in the UK.
- 2022–2023 United States P. aeruginosa outbreak in eye drops

== See also ==
- List of food contamination incidents
- List of foodborne illness outbreaks
- Toxic cough syrup
