= Peter Nemes =

Hungarian-American chemist

Peter Nemes is a Hungarian-American chemist, who is active in the fields of bioanalytical chemistry, mass spectrometry, cell/developmental biology, neuroscience, and biochemistry.

== Biography ==
Nemes has been an associate professor at the University of Maryland, College Park (UMD) since January 2018. Prior to his appointment there, he was an assistant professor at the Department of Chemistry at George Washington University (Washington, DC), where he taught bioanalytical chemistry. Nemes graduated with summa cum laude with a Master's of Science (M.Sc.) from the Eötvös Loránd University in 2004. His original thesis research was conducted in the Department of Mass Spectrometry at the Hungarian Academy of Sciences, Budapest, Hungary. Under mentorship by Vekey Karoly, Nemes studied the formation of amino acid clusters in the gas phase upon electrospray ionization,^{1} such as the magic serine clusters that preferentially incorporate amino acids and sugars of certain chirality matching those enriched on Earth. During his PhD in Akos Vertes’ laboratory at the Department of Chemistry, The George Washington University (GWU; Washington, DC) between 2005 and 2009, he established the significance of spraying modes/regimes during electrospray ionization (ESI) mass spectrometry (MS) in efficient and soft ion generation^{2} and the confirmational state of proteins^{3}. He also invented and patented laser ablation electrospray ionization (LAESI)^{4} mass spectrometry for in situ and in vivo analysis^{4} of tissues and single cells^{5} 2- and 3-dimensional molecular imaging MS^{6} at ambient conditions for biological samples. He completed postdoctoral training in analytical neuroscience with Jonathan V. Sweedler at the University of Illinois Urbana–Champaign, IL. There, he developed capillary electrophoresis ESI MS instruments^{7} and built a unique matrix-assisted laser desorption ionization (MALDI–C_{60} secondary ionization mass spectrometry (SIMS) dual-ion source mass spectrometer^{8} to enable the analysis of small and large molecules in single cells.^{9}

In 2011, Nemes became a Staff Fellow and then also Laboratory Leader at the US Food and Drug Administration (2011–2013). An independent investigator, Nemes developed a high-throughput approach^{10} based on Direct analysis in real time to enable the rapid differentiation of heparin from glycosaminoglycans, including authentic adulterated products confiscated by the FDA during the 2008 heparin crisis. Nemes also established the mass spectrometry facility at the White Oak Headquarters of the US FDA with several mass spectrometers to support regulatory science.

As a professor since 2013, Nemes has conducted cutting-edge research at the interface of bioanalytical instrumental chemistry and neurodevelopmental biology and taught courses in analytical chemistry and mass spectrometry. In Fall 2013, Nemes became an assistant professor at the Department of Chemistry at George Washington University (Washington, DC), where he taught analytical chemistry. In January 2018, Nemes became an associate professor at the Department of Chemistry & Biochemistry, the University of Maryland, College Park (UMD), where he has been teaching instrumental analytical chemistry and biological mass spectrometry. Research in the Nemes Laboratory develops ultrasensitive and microanalytical platforms for high-resolution MS to study metabolic and proteomic processes with implications in cell and neurodevelopmental biology and health research. Using custom-built single-cell MS instruments, his research group has uncovered previously unknown metabolomic^{11} and proteomic^{12} differences between single embryonic cells that are fated to give rise to different types of tissues during vertebrate development. Their highly sensitive bottom-up proteomic approach enabled the detection intra-cell type cell heterogeneity in the embryo.^{13} Further, the group has also discovered molecules that are able to alter normal cell fate decisions in the embryo.^{11} The investigators next developed microprobe technologies that enabled the direct, in vivo analysis of these small^{14} and large^{15} molecules in cells in X. laevis embryos undergoing normal development. These results challenge basic understanding of molecular processes that are necessary for normal embryonic body and brain development and raise important implications to help understand, promote, and protect the health of humans and animals.^{16}

Nemes has authored 46 peer-reviewed publications, 6 book chapters, and ~200 presentations. In 2015, Nemes was named a Beckman Young Investigator by the Arnold and Mabel Beckman Foundation and received the Arthur F. Findeis Award for Achievements by a Young Analytical Chemist by the Division of Analytical Chemistry of the American Chemical Society. In 2017, he received the DuPont Young Professor Award, the Robert J. Cotter New Investigator Award by the US Human Proteome Organization, and a Research Award from the American Society for Mass Spectrometry (ASMS). In 2018, Nemes was awarded the Georges Guiochon Faculty Fellowship from HPLC, Inct. Research in the Nemes Lab has been continuously funded by professional societies, companies, and federal funding agencies. Nemes holds a CAREER award from the Directorate of Biological Research of the National Science Foundation (NSF) and an Outstanding Research Award (R35) from the National Institute of General Medical Sciences (NIGMS).

== Representative publications (*Corresponding author) ==
^{1}P. Nemes, G. Schlosser, and K. Vekey*, Amino acid cluster formation studied by electrospray ionization mass spectrometry, J. Mass Spectrom. 2005, 40, 43, https://doi.org/10.1002/jms.771

^{2}P. Nemes, I. Marginean, and A. Vertes*, Spraying mode effect on droplet formation and ion chemistry in electrosprays, Anal. Chem. 2007, 79, 3105, https://doi.org/10.1021/ac062382i

^{3}P. Nemes, S. Goyal, and A. Vertes*, Conformational and noncovalent complexation changes in proteins during electrospray ionization, Anal. Chem. 2008, 80, 387–395, https://doi.org/10.1021/ac0714359

^{4}P. Nemes and A. Vertes*, Laser ablation electrospray ionization for atmospheric pressure, in vivo, and imaging mass spectrometry, Anal. Chem. 2007, 79, 8098, https://doi.org/10.1021/ac071181r

^{5}B. Shrestha, P. Nemes, and A. Vertes*, Ablation and analysis of small cell populations and single cells by consecutive laser pulses, Appl. Phys. A 2010, https://doi.org/10.1007/s00339-010-5781-2

^{6}P. Nemes, A. A. Barton, and A. Vertes*, Three-dimensional imaging of metabolites in tissues under native conditions by laser ablation electrospray ionization mass spectrometry, Anal. Chem. 2009, 81, 6668, https://doi.org/10.1021/ac900745e

^{7}P. Nemes, S. S. Rubakhin, J. Aerts, and J. V. Sweedler*, Qualitative and quantitative metabolomic investigation of single neurons by capillary electrophoresis electrospray ionization mass spectrometry, Nat. Protoc. 2013, 8, 783, https://doi.org/10.1038/nprot.2013.035

^{8}E. J. Lanni, S. J. B. Dunham, P. Nemes, S. S. Rubakhin, J. V. Sweedler*, Biomolecular imaging with a C_{60}-SIMS/MALDI dual ion source hybrid mass spectrometer: Instrumentation, matrix enhancement and single cell analysis, J. Am. Soc. Mass Spectrom. 2014, 11, 1897–1907, https://doi.org/10.1007/s13361-014-0978-9

^{9}S. S. Rubakhin, E. V. Romanova, P. Nemes, and J. V. Sweedler, Profiling metabolites and peptides in single cells, Nat. Methods 2011, 8, S20–S29, https://doi.org/10.1038/nmeth.1549

^{10}P. Nemes*, W. J. Hoover, and D. A. Keire, High-throughput differentiation of heparin from other glycosaminoglycans by pyrolysis mass spectrometry, Anal. Chem. 2013, 85, 7405–7412, https://doi.org/10.1021/ac401318q

^{11}R. M. Onjiko, S. A. Moody, and P. Nemes*, Single-cell mass spectrometry reveals small molecules that affect cell fates in the 16-cell embryo, Proc. Natl. Acad. Sci. USA 2015, 112, 6545, https://doi.org/10.1073/pnas.1423682112

^{12}C. Lombard-Banek, S. A. Moody, and P. Nemes*, Single-cell mass spectrometry for discovery proteomics: quantifying translational cell heterogeneity in the 16-cell frog (Xenopus) embryo, Angew. Chem. Int. Ed. 2016, 55, 2454, https://doi.org/10.1002/anie.201510411

^{13}C. Lombard-Banek, Sally A. Moody, and P. Nemes*, Label-free quantification of proteins in single embryonic cells with neural fate in the cleavage-stage frog (Xenopus laevis) embryo using capillary electrophoresis electrospray ionization high resolution mass spectrometry (CE-ESI-HRMS), Mol. Cell. Prot. 2016, 15, 2756, https://doi.org/10.1074/mcp.M115.057760

^{14}R. M. Onjiko, E. P. Portero, S. A. Moody, and P. Nemes*, In situ microprobe single-cell capillary electrophoresis mass spectrometry: Metabolic reorganization in single differentiating cells in the live vertebrate (X. laevis) embryo, Anal. Chem. 2017, 89, 7069, https://doi.org/10.1021/acs.analchem.7b00880

^{15}C. Lombard-Banek, S. A. Moody, M. Chiara Manzini, and P. Nemes*, Microsampling capillary electrophoresis mass spectrometry enables single-cell proteomics in complex tissues: developing cell clones in live Xenopus laevis and zebrafish embryos, Anal. Chem. 2019, 91, 4797, https://doi.org/10.1021/acs.analchem.9b00345

^{16}C. Lombard-Banek, E. P. Portero, R. M. Onjiko, and P. Nemes*, New-generation mass spectrometry expands the toolbox of cell and developmental biology, genesis 2016, 55, e23012, https://doi.org/10.1002/dvg.23012

== Awards ==
- 2018 Georges Guiochon Faculty Fellowship, HPLC Inc.
- 2017 Research Award, the American Society for Mass Spectrometry (ASMS)
- 2017 Scientific Achievement Award (co-recipients: Samanthi Wickramasekara, Hongli Li, and David Keire), the US Food and Drug Administration (FDA)
- 2017 Robert J. Cotter New Investigator Award, the US Human Proteome Organization (HUPO)
- 2016 DuPont Young Professor Award, the DuPont company (Wilmington, DE)
- 2016 Arthur F. Findeis Award for Achievements by a Young Analytical Chemist, the American Chemical Society (ACS) Division of Analytical Chemistry
- 2016 Helmsley Fellowship for Cross-Disciplinary Research, the Cold Spring Harbor Laboratory (Cold Spring Harbor, NY) and the Helmsley Charitable Trust
- 2016 Emerging Investigator, the Journal of the American Society for Mass Spectrometry (JASMS)
- 2015 Emerging Investigator, the Analyst
- 2015-2019 Beckman Young Investigator, the Arnold and Mabel Beckman Foundation (Irvine, CA)
- 2011 Special Recognition Award for Establishing a Mass Spectrometry Research Facility, US FDA, Silver Spring, MD
- 2010 Science and Technology Innovation Award, Baxter Healthcare Corporation (Chicago, IL)
- 2009 The American Institute of Chemists prize in Chemistry, the American Institute of Chemists (Washington, DC)
- 2008 Young investigator Travel Award, the Washington-Baltimore Mass Spectrometry Discussion Group
- 2008 International Research Fellowship Award, the Dimitris N. Chorafas Foundation (Luzern, Switzerland)
- 2007 Young Investigator Travel Award, the Mass Spectrometry Discussion Group
