= Chinese export recalls =

Chinese export recalls may refer to:

- 2007 Chinese export recalls
- 2008 Chinese heparin adulteration
