= Ethylene glycol poisoning =

Toxicity from too much ethylene glycol

- Other names: Ethylene glycol toxicity, ethylene glycol overdose
- Ethylene glycol
- Specialty: Emergency medicine
- Symptoms: Early: intoxication, vomiting, abdominal pain Later: decreased level of consciousness, headache, seizures
- Complications: Kidney failure, brain damage
- Causes: Drinking ethylene glycol
- Diagnostic method: Calcium oxalate crystals in the urine, acidosis or increased osmol gap in the blood
- Treatment: Antidote, hemodialysis
- Medication: Fomepizole, ethanol
- Frequency: > 5,000 cases per year (US)

Ethylene glycol poisoning is poisoning caused by drinking ethylene glycol. Early symptoms include intoxication, vomiting and abdominal pain. Later symptoms may include a decreased level of consciousness, headache, and seizures. Long term outcomes may include kidney failure and brain damage. Toxicity and death may occur after drinking even a small amount as ethylene glycol is more toxic than other diols.

Ethylene glycol is a colorless, odorless, sweet liquid, commonly found in antifreeze. It may be drunk accidentally or intentionally in a suicide attempt. When broken down by the body it results in glycolic acid and oxalic acid which cause most of the toxicity. The diagnosis may be suspected when calcium oxalate crystals are seen in the urine or when acidosis or an increased osmol gap is present in the blood. Diagnosis may be confirmed by measuring ethylene glycol levels in the blood; however, many hospitals do not have the ability to perform this test.

Early treatment increases the chance of a good outcome. Treatment consists of stabilizing the person, followed by the use of an antidote. The preferred antidote is fomepizole with ethanol used if this is not available. Hemodialysis may also be used in those where there is organ damage or a high degree of acidosis. Other treatments may include sodium bicarbonate, thiamine, and magnesium.

More than 5,000 cases of poisoning occur in the United States each year. Those affected are often adults and male. Deaths from ethylene glycol have been reported as early as 1930. An outbreak of deaths in 1937 due to a medication mixed in a similar compound, diethylene glycol, resulted in the Food, Drug, and Cosmetic Act of 1938 in the United States, which mandated evidence of safety before new medications could be sold. Antifreeze products sometimes have a substance to make them bitter added to discourage drinking by children and animals, but this has not been found to be effective.

== Signs and symptoms ==
Signs of ethylene glycol poisoning depend upon the time after ingestion. Symptoms usually follow a three-step progression, although poisoned individuals will not always develop each stage.

- Stage 1 (30 minutes to 12 hours) consists of neurological and gastrointestinal symptoms and looks similar to alcohol poisoning. Poisoned individuals may appear to be intoxicated, dizzy, lacking coordination of muscle movements, drooling, depressed, and have slurred speech, seizures, abnormal eye movements, headaches, and confusion. Irritation to the stomach may cause nausea and vomiting. Also seen are excessive thirst and urination. Over time, the body metabolizes ethylene glycol into other toxins.
- Stage 2 (12 to 36 hours) where signs of "alcohol" poisoning appear to resolve, underlying severe internal damage is still occurring. An elevated heart rate, hyperventilation or increased breathing effort, and dehydration may start to develop, along with high blood pressure and metabolic acidosis. These symptoms are a result of accumulation of organic acids formed by the metabolism of ethylene glycol. Additionally low calcium concentrations in the blood, overactive muscle reflexes, muscle spasms, QT interval prolongation, and congestive heart failure may occur. If untreated, death most commonly occurs during this period.
- Stage 3 (24 to 72 hours) kidney failure is the result of ethylene glycol poisoning. In cats, this stage occurs 12–24 hours after consuming antifreeze; in dogs, at 36–72 hours after consuming antifreeze. During this stage, severe kidney failure is developing secondary to calcium oxalate crystals forming in the kidneys. Severe lethargy, coma, depression, vomiting, seizures, drooling, and inappetence may be seen. Other symptoms include acute tubular necrosis, red blood cells in the urine, excess proteins in the urine, lower back pain, decreased or absent production of urine, elevated blood concentration of potassium, and acute kidney failure. If kidney failure occurs it is typically reversible, although weeks or months of supportive care including hemodialysis may be required before kidney function returns.

== Sources ==
The most common source of ethylene glycol is automotive antifreeze or radiator coolant, where concentrations are high. Other sources of ethylene glycol include windshield deicing agents, brake fluid, motor oil, developing solutions for hobby photographers, wood stains, solvents, and paints. Some people put antifreeze into their cabin's toilet to prevent it from freezing during the winter, resulting in toxicities when animals drink from the toilet. Small amounts of ethylene glycol may be contained in holiday ornaments such as snow globes.

The most significant source of ethylene glycol is from aircraft de-icing and anti-icing operations, where it is released onto land and eventually to waterways near airports experiencing cold winter climates. It is also used in manufacturing polyester products. In 2006, approximately 1540 kilotonnes of ethylene glycol were manufactured in Canada by three companies in Alberta, with most of the production destined for export.

== Pathophysiology ==
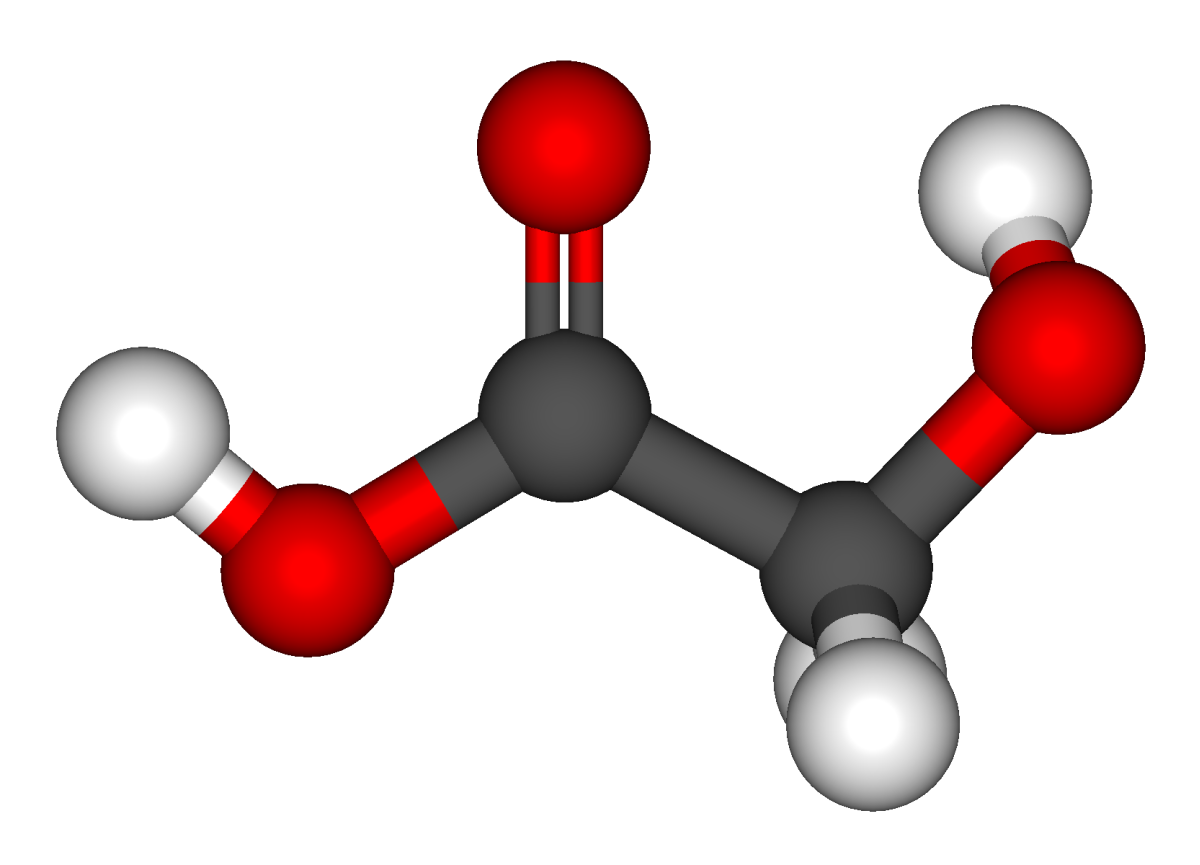
Glycolic acid is the major metabolite of ethylene glycol responsible for toxicity

The three main systems affected by ethylene glycol poisoning are the central nervous system, metabolic processes, and the kidneys. The central nervous system is affected early in the course of poisoning as the result of a direct action of ethylene glycol. Similar to ethanol, it causes intoxication, followed by drowsiness or coma. Seizures may occur due to a direct effect. The toxic mechanism of ethylene glycol poisoning is mainly due to the metabolites of ethylene glycol. Initially it is metabolized by alcohol dehydrogenase to glycolaldehyde, which is then oxidized to glycolic acid by aldehyde dehydrogenase.

The increase in metabolites may cause encephalopathy or cerebral edema. The metabolic effects occur 12 to 36 hours post ingestion, causing primarily metabolic acidosis which is due mainly to accumulated glycolic acid. Additionally, as a side effect of the first two steps of metabolism, an increase in the blood concentration of lactic acid occurs contributing to lactic acidosis. The formation of acid metabolites also causes inhibition of other metabolic pathways, such as oxidative phosphorylation.

The kidney toxicity of ethylene glycol occurs 24 to 72 hours post ingestion and is caused by a direct cytotoxic effect of glycolic acid. The glycolic acid is then metabolized to glyoxylic acid and finally to oxalic acid. Oxalic acid binds with calcium to form calcium oxalate crystals which may deposit and cause damage to many areas of the body including the brain, heart, kidneys, and lungs. The most significant effect is accumulation of calcium oxalate crystals in the kidneys which causes kidney damage leading to oliguric or anuric acute kidney failure. The rate-limiting step in this cascade is the conversion of glycolic to glyoxylic acid. Accumulation of glycolic acid in the body is mainly responsible for toxicity.

=== Toxicity ===
Ethylene glycol has been shown to be toxic to humans and is also toxic to domestic pets such as cats and dogs. A toxic dose requiring medical treatment varies but is considered more than 0.1 mL per kg body weight (mL/kg) of pure substance. That is roughly 16 mL of 50% ethylene glycol for an 80 kg adult and 4 mL for a 20 kg child. Poison control centers often use more than a lick or taste in a child or more than a mouthful in an adult as a dose requiring hospital assessment.

The orally lethal dose in humans has been reported as approximately 1.4 mL/kg of pure ethylene glycol. That is approximately 224 mL (7.6 oz.) of 50% ethylene glycol for an 80 kg adult and 56 mL (2 oz.) for a 20 kg child. Although survival with medical treatment has occurred with doses much higher than this, death has occurred with 30 mL of the concentrate in an adult. In the EU classification of dangerous substances it is 'harmful' (Xn) while more toxic substances are classified as 'toxic' (T) or 'very toxic' (T+). The U.S. Environmental Protection Agency generally puts substances which are lethal at more than 30 g to adults in Toxicity Class III.

Ethylene glycol has a low vapor pressure; it does not evaporate readily at normal temperatures and therefore high concentrations in air or intoxication are unlikely to occur following inhalational exposures. There may be a slight risk of poisoning where mists or fogs are generated, although this rarely leads to poisoning as ethylene glycol causes irritation and coughing when breathed in, alerting victims to its presence. Ethylene glycol is not well absorbed through skin meaning poisoning following dermal exposure is also uncommon.

== Diagnosis ==
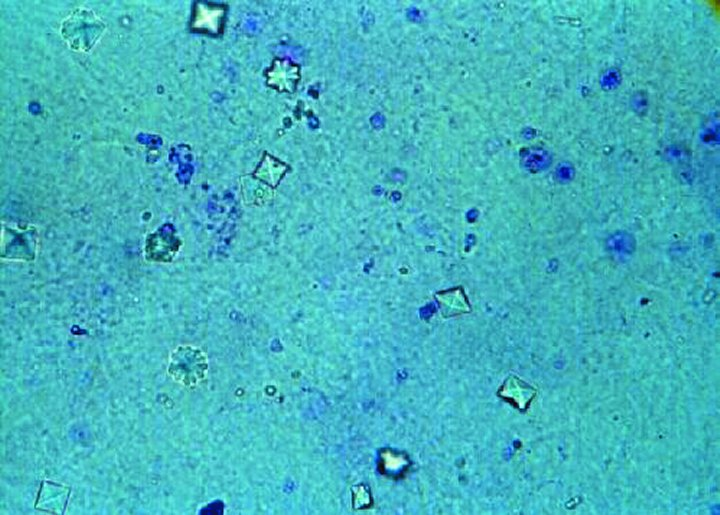
Urine microscopy showing calcium oxalate crystals in the urine

As many of the clinical signs and symptoms of ethylene glycol poisoning are nonspecific and occur in many poisonings; the diagnosis is often difficult. It is most reliably diagnosed by the measurement of the blood ethylene glycol concentration. Ethylene glycol in biological fluids can be determined by gas chromatography. Many hospital laboratories do not have the ability to perform this blood test and in the absence of this test the diagnosis must be made based on the presentation of the person.

In this situation a helpful test to diagnose poisoning is the measurement of the osmolal gap. The person's serum osmolality is measured by freezing point depression and then compared with the predicted osmolality based on the person's measured sodium, glucose, blood urea nitrogen, and any ethanol that may have been ingested. The presence of a large osmolal gap supports a diagnosis of ethylene glycol poisoning. However, a normal osmolar gap does not rule out ethylene glycol exposure because of wide individual variability.

The increased osmolal gap is caused by the ethylene glycol itself. As the metabolism of ethylene glycol progresses there will be less ethylene glycol and this will decrease the blood ethylene glycol concentration and the osmolal gap making this test less useful. Additionally, the presence of other alcohols such as ethanol, isopropanol, or methanol or conditions such as alcoholism or diabetic ketoacidosis, lactic acidosis, or kidney failure may also produce an elevated osmolal gap leading to a false diagnosis.

Other laboratory abnormalities may suggest poisoning, especially the presence of a metabolic acidosis, particularly if it is characterized by a large anion gap. Large anion gap acidosis is usually present during the initial stage of poisoning. However, acidosis has a large number of differential diagnoses, including poisoning from methanol, salicylates, iron, isoniazid, paracetamol, theophylline, or from conditions such as uremia or diabetic and alcoholic ketoacidosis.

The diagnosis of ethylene glycol poisoning should be considered in any people with a severe acidosis. Urine microscopy can reveal needle or envelope-shaped calcium oxalate crystals in the urine which can suggest poisoning; although these crystals may not be present until the late stages of poisoning. Finally, many commercial radiator antifreeze products have fluorescein added to enable radiator leaks to be detected using a Wood's lamp. Following ingestion of antifreeze products containing ethylene glycol and fluorescein, a Wood's lamp may reveal fluorescence of a person's mouth area, clothing, vomitus, or urine which can help to diagnose poisoning.

== Prevention ==
Antifreeze products for automotive use containing propylene glycol in place of ethylene glycol are available, and are generally considered safer to use, as it possesses an unpleasant taste in contrast to the perceived "sweet" taste of toxic ethylene glycol-based coolants, and produces only lactic acid in an animal's body, as their muscles do when exercised.

When using antifreeze products containing ethylene glycol, recommended safety measures include:

- Cleaning up any spill immediately and thoroughly. Spills may be cleaned by sprinkling cat litter, sand or other absorbent material directly on the spill. Once fully absorbed, while wearing protective gloves, the material may be scooped into a plastic bag, sealed and disposed. The spill area may be scrubbed with a stiff brush and warm, soapy water. The soapy water is not recommended to be drained in a storm drain.
- Checking vehicles regularly for leaks.
- Storing antifreeze in clearly marked original sealed containers, in areas that are inaccessible to pets or small children.
- Keeping pets and small children away from the area when draining the car radiator.
- Disposing of used antifreeze only by taking to a service station.
- If antifreeze is placed in toilets, ensuring the lid is down and the door closed.

== Treatment ==
=== Stabilization and decontamination ===
The most important initial treatment for ethylene glycol poisoning is stabilizing the person. As ethylene glycol is rapidly absorbed, gastric decontamination is unlikely to be of benefit unless it is performed within 60 minutes of ingestion. Traditionally, gastric lavage or nasogastric aspiration of gastric contents are the most common methods employed in ethylene glycol poisoning. The usefulness of gastric lavage has, however, been questioned, and it is now no longer used routinely in poisoning situations. Ipecac-induced vomiting is not recommended. As activated charcoal does not adsorb glycols, it is not recommended as it will not be effective at preventing absorption. It is only used in the presence of a toxic dose of another poison or drug. People with significant poisoning often present in a critical condition. In this situation stabilization of the person including airway management with intubation should be performed in preference to gastrointestinal decontamination. People presenting with metabolic acidosis or seizures require treatment with sodium bicarbonate and anticonvulsives such as a benzodiazepine respectively. Sodium bicarbonate should be used cautiously as it can worsen hypocalcemia by increasing the plasma protein binding of calcium. If hypocalcemia occurs it can be treated with calcium replacement although calcium supplementation can increase the precipitation of calcium oxalate crystals leading to tissue damage. Intubation and respiratory support may be required in severely intoxicated people; people with hypotension require treatment with intravenous fluids and possibly vasopressors.

=== Antidotes ===
Following decontamination and the institution of supportive measures, the next priority is inhibition of further ethylene glycol metabolism using antidotes. The antidotes for ethylene glycol poisoning are ethanol and fomepizole. This antidotal treatment forms the mainstay of management of ethylene glycol poisoning. The toxicity of ethylene glycol comes from its metabolism to glycolic acid and oxalic acid. The goal of pharmacotherapy is to prevent the formation of these metabolites. Ethanol acts by competing with ethylene glycol for alcohol dehydrogenase (ADH), the first enzyme in the degradation pathway. Because ethanol has nearly 100 times more affinity for ADH, it blocks the breakdown of ethylene glycol into glycolaldehyde, thus preventing further degradation to oxalic acid and the associated nephrotoxic effects. The unreacted ethylene glycol remains in the body and is eventually excreted in the urine; however, supportive therapy for the CNS depression and metabolic acidosis will be required until the ethylene glycol concentrations fall below toxic limits. Pharmaceutical grade ethanol is usually given intravenously as a 5 or 10% solution in 5% dextrose, but it is also sometimes given orally in the form of a strong spirit such as whisky, vodka, or gin.

Fomepizole is a potent inhibitor of alcohol dehydrogenase; similar to ethanol, it acts to block the formation of the toxic metabolites. Fomepizole has been shown to be highly effective as an antidote for ethylene glycol poisoning. It is the only antidote approved by the U.S. Food and Drug Administration for the treatment of ethylene glycol poisoning. Both antidotes have advantages and disadvantages. Ethanol is readily available in most hospitals, is inexpensive, and can be administered orally as well as intravenously. Its adverse effects include intoxication, hypoglycemia in children, and possible liver toxicity. People receiving ethanol therapy also require frequent blood ethanol concentration measurements and dosage adjustments to maintain a therapeutic ethanol concentration. People therefore must be monitored in an intensive care unit. Alternatively, the adverse side effects of fomepizole are minimal and the approved dosing regimen maintains therapeutic concentrations without the need to monitor blood concentrations of the drug. The disadvantage of fomepizole is that it is expensive. Costing US$1,000 per gram, an average course used in an adult poisoning would cost approximately $3,500 to $4,000. Despite the cost, fomepizole is gradually replacing ethanol as the antidote of choice in ethylene glycol poisoning.

Adjunct agents including thiamine and pyridoxine are often given, because they may help prevent the formation of oxalic acid. The use of these agents is based on theoretical observations and there is limited evidence to support their use in treatment; they may be of particular benefit in people who could be deficient in these vitamins such as those who are malnourished or alcoholic.

=== Hemodialysis ===
In addition to antidotes, an important treatment for poisoning is the use of hemodialysis. Hemodialysis is used to enhance the removal of unmetabolized ethylene glycol, as well as its metabolites from the body. It has been shown to be highly effective in the removal of ethylene glycol and its metabolites from the blood. Hemodialysis also has the added benefit of correcting other metabolic derangements or supporting deteriorating kidney function. Hemodialysis is usually indicated in people with severe metabolic acidosis (blood pH less than 7.3), kidney failure, severe electrolyte imbalance, or if the person's condition is deteriorating despite treatment. Often both antidotal treatment and hemodialysis are used together in the treatment of poisoning. Because hemodialysis will also remove the antidotes from the blood, doses of antidotes need to be increased to compensate. If hemodialysis is not available, then peritoneal dialysis also removes ethylene glycol, although less efficiently.

== Prognosis ==
Treatment for antifreeze poisoning needs to be started as soon after ingestion as possible to be effective; the earlier treatment is started, the greater the chance of survival. Cats must be treated within 3 hours of ingesting of antifreeze to be effective, while dogs must be treated within 8–12 hours of ingestion. Once kidney failure develops, the prognosis is poor.

Generally, if the person is treated and survives then a full recovery is expected. People who present early to medical facilities and have prompt medical treatment typically will have a favorable outcome. Alternatively, people presenting late with signs and symptoms of coma, hyperkalemia, seizures, or severe acidosis have a poor prognosis. People who develop severe central nervous system manifestations or stroke who survive may have long term neurologic dysfunction; in some cases they may recover, although convalescence may be prolonged. The most significant long-term complication is related to the kidneys. Cases of permanent kidney damage, often requiring chronic dialysis or kidney transplantation, have been reported after severe poisoning.

== Epidemiology ==
Ethylene glycol poisoning is a relatively common occurrence worldwide. Human poisoning often occurs in isolated cases, but may also occur in epidemics. Many cases of poisoning are the result of using ethylene glycol as a cheap substitute for alcohol or intentional ingestions in suicide attempts. Less commonly it has been used as a means of homicide. Children or animals may be exposed by accidental ingestion; children and animals often consume large amounts due to ethylene glycol having a sweet taste. In the United States there were 5816 cases reported to poison centers in 2002. Additionally, ethylene glycol was the most common chemical responsible for deaths reported by US poison centers in 2003. In Australia there were 17 cases reported to the Victorian poison center and 30 cases reported to the New South Wales poison center in 2007. However, these numbers may underestimate actual numbers because not all cases attributable to ethylene glycol are reported to poison control centers. Most deaths from ethylene glycol are intentional suicides; deaths in children due to unintentional ingestion are extremely rare.

In an effort to prevent poisoning, often a bittering agent called denatonium benzoate, known by the trade name Bitrex, is added to ethylene glycol preparations as an adversant to prevent accidental or intentional ingestion. The bittering agent is thought to stop ingestion as part of the human defense against ingestion of harmful substances is rejection of bitter tasting substances. In the United States, eight states (Oregon, California, New Mexico, Virginia, Arizona, Maine, Tennessee, Washington) have made the addition of bittering agents to antifreeze compulsory. Three follow up studies targeting limited populations or suicidal persons to assess the efficacy of bittering agents in preventing toxicity or death have, however, shown limited benefit of bittering ethylene glycol preparations in these two populations. Specifically, Mullins finds that bittering of antifreeze does not reduce reported cases of poisoning of preschoolers in the US state of Oregon. Similarly, White found that adding bittering agents did not decrease the frequency or severity of antifreeze poisonings in children under the age of 5. Additionally, another study by White found that suicidal persons are not deterred by the bittered taste of antifreeze in their attempts to kill themselves. These studies did not focus on poisoning of domestic pets or livestock, for example, or inadvertent exposure to bittered antifreeze among a large population (of non-preschool age children).

Poisoning of a raccoon was diagnosed in 2002 in Prince Edward Island, Canada. An online veterinary manual provides information on lethal doses of ethylene glycol for chicken, cattle, as well as cats and dogs, adding that younger animals may be more susceptible.

== History ==
Ethylene glycol was once thought innocuous; in 1931 it was suggested as being suitable for use as a vehicle or solvent for injectable pharmaceutical preparations. Numerous cases of poisoning have been reported since then, and it has been shown to be toxic to humans.

== Environmental effects ==
Ethylene glycol involved in aircraft de-icing and anti-icing operations is released onto land and eventually to waterways. A report prepared for the World Health Organization in 2000 stated that laboratory tests exposing aquatic organisms to stream water receiving runoff from airports have shown toxic effects and death (p. 12). Field studies in the vicinity of an airport have reported toxic signs consistent with ethylene glycol poisoning, fish kills, and reduced biodiversity, although those effects could not definitively be ascribed to ethylene glycol (p. 12). The process of biodegrading of glycols also increases the risk to organisms, as oxygen levels become depleted in surface waters (p. 13). Another study found the toxicity to aquatic and other organisms was relatively low, but the oxygen-depletion effect of biodegradation was more serious (p. 245). Further, "Anaerobic biodegradation may also release relatively toxic byproducts such as acetaldehyde, ethanol, acetate, and methane (p. 245)."

In Canada, Environment Canada reports that "in recent years, management practices at Canada’s major airports have improved with the installation of new ethylene glycol application and mitigation facilities or improvements to existing ones." Since 1994, federal airports must comply with the Glycol Guidelines of the Canadian Environmental Protection Act, monitoring and reporting on concentrations of glycols in surface water. Detailed mitigation plans include storage and handling issues (p. 27), spill response procedures, and measures taken to reduce volumes of fluid (p. 28). Considering factors such as the "seasonal nature of releases, ambient temperatures, metabolic rates and duration of exposure", Environment Canada stated in 2014 that "it is proposed that ethylene glycol is not entering the environment in a quantity or concentration or under conditions that have or may have an immediate or long-term harmful effect on the environment or its biological diversity".

In the U.S., airports are required to obtain stormwater discharge permits and ensure that wastes from deicing operations are properly collected and treated. Large new airports may be required to collect 60 percent of aircraft deicing fluid after deicing. Airports that discharge the collected aircraft deicing fluid directly to waters of the U.S. must also meet numeric discharge requirements for chemical oxygen demand. A report in 2000 stated that ethylene glycol was becoming less popular for aircraft deicing in the U.S., due to its reporting requirements and adverse environmental impacts (p. 213), and noted a shift to the use of propylene glycol (p. I-3).

== Other animals ==
Once kidney failure has developed in dogs and cats, the outcome is poor. The treatment is generally the same, although vodka or rectified spirits may be substituted for pharmaceutical grade ethanol in IV injections.

== See also ==
- Methylmalonic acidemia – an autosomal recessive metabolic disorder that mimics the effects of ethylene glycol poisoning.
- 1985 diethylene glycol wine scandal
- Elixir sulfanilamide, a banned medicine that caused mass poisoning because it used ethylene glycol as a solvent
- Methanol poisoning
