= Massengill =

Massengill is an English surname of Old Norse origin. Notable people with the surname include:

- David Massengill (born 1951), American folk singer
- Nathan Massengill (born 1970), American comic book artist
- Steve Massengill (born 1966), American politician

== See also ==
- S. E. Massengill Company, American pharmaceutical company
