= Toxic cough syrup =

Mass poisonings since the 1990s

Since the 1990s, several mass poisonings from toxic cough syrup have occurred in developing countries. In these cases, an ingredient in cough syrup, glycerine (glycerol), was replaced with diethylene glycol, a cheaper alternative to glycerine for industrial applications. Diethylene glycol is nephrotoxic and can result in multiple organ dysfunction syndrome (MODS), especially in children.

== History ==
There have been poisonings in Haiti, Bangladesh, Indonesia, Marshall Islands, Pakistan, Panama, The Gambia, India (twice), Uzbekistan, and Cameroon between 1992 and 2022, due to contaminated cough syrup and other medications that incorporated inexpensive diethylene glycol instead of glycerine.

=== Haiti ===
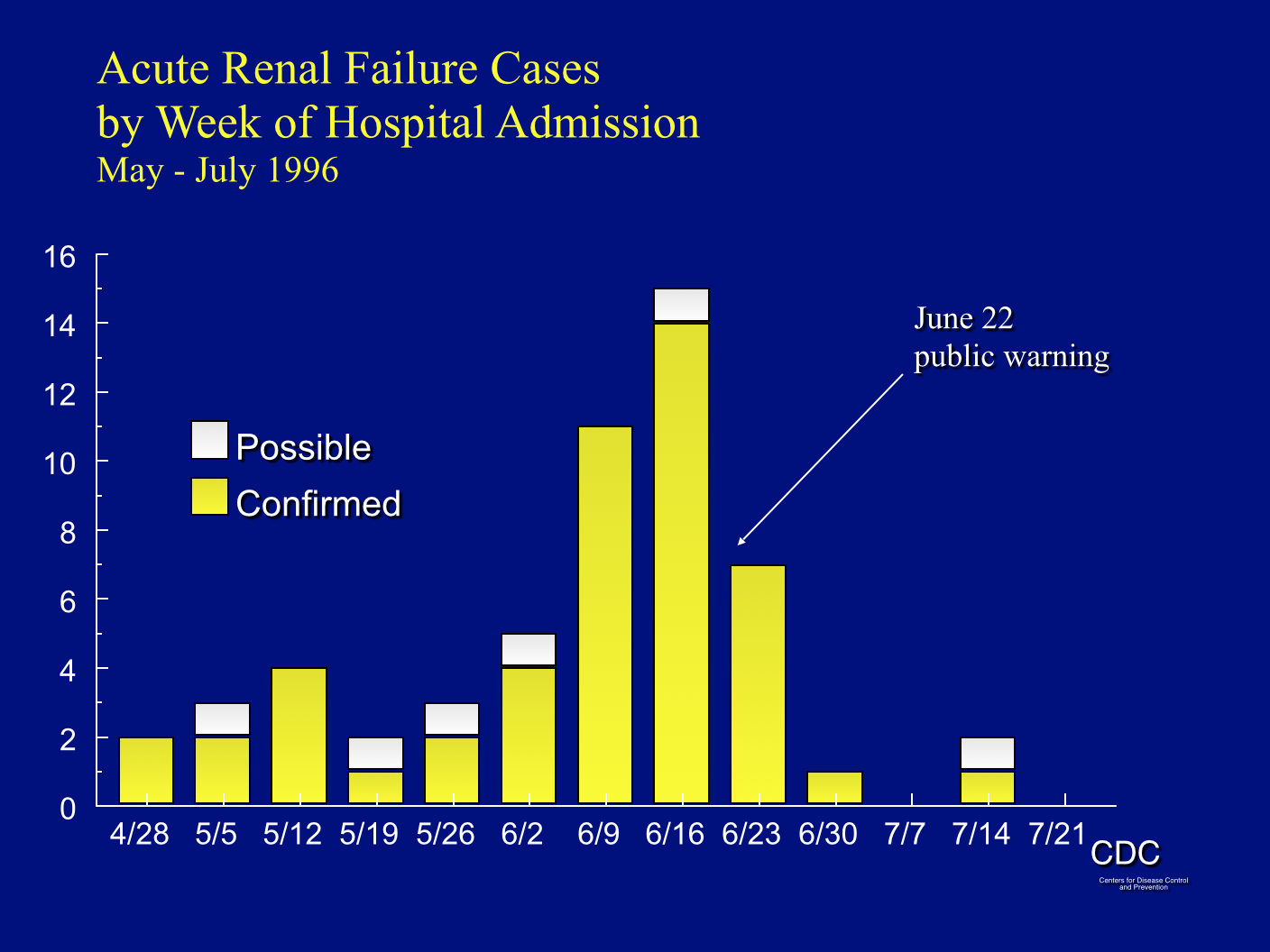
Haiti 1996 DEG epidemic curve

The Haitian glycerine case dates from 1996. Researchers identified 109 cases of acute renal failure among children in Haiti, of which 88 died. It involved contaminated glycerine supplied by Dutch trader in chemicals Vos BV to Haitian manufacturer Pharval, which used it in cough and fever syrups Afébril and Valodon. The glycerine drums provided by Vos were labelled as 98% USP-grade glycerine but in fact contained only about 54% glycerine and a large proportion of diethylene glycol, leading to acute kidney failure and the death. The glycerine was obtained from an unknown Chinese company. Dutch authorities initially declined to prosecute Vos BV for homicide-related offences, but later investigations showed the company had been warned by a lab that the batch was impure. However, the Vos company did not warn Pharval about it. Vos ultimately settled a Dutch environmental-law case in 2001 with a 500,000 guilder payment. The Dutch government later gave a donation to victims’ families, framing it as a humanitarian gesture rather than an admission of state liability.

=== Bangladesh ===
Discovering and tracing a toxic syrup to its source has been difficult for health care providers and governmental agencies due to difficult communication between the governments of developed countries and developing countries. For example, Michael L. Bennish, an American pediatrician who works in developing countries, had been volunteering in Bangladesh as a physician and had noticed a number of deaths that seemed to coincide with the distribution of the government-issued cough syrup. The government rebuffed his attempts at investigating the medication. In response, Bennish smuggled bottles of the syrup in his suitcase when returning to the United States, allowing pharmaceutical laboratories in Massachusetts to identify the poisonous diethylene glycol, which can appear very similar to the less dangerous glycerine. Bennish went on to author a 1995 article in the British Medical Journal about his experience, writing that, given the amount of medication prescribed, death tolls "must [already] be in the tens of thousands".

=== India ===
The 2025 India cough syrup crisis was a public health tragedy involving the deaths of several children in Madhya Pradesh and Rajasthan after consuming contaminated cough syrups. In Chhindwara district of Madhya Pradesh, at least 24 children died after taking Coldrif syrup manufactured by Sresan Pharma, which was later found to contain diethylene glycol (DEG), a toxic chemical used in industrial solvents. Around the same period, three children in Rajasthan died after consuming Kufdil and other dextromethorphan-based syrups distributed under the state’s free medicine scheme.

Laboratory analyses confirmed the presence of harmful substances and mislabeling in the affected batches. The Union Ministry of Health and Family Welfare ordered a nationwide recall of the implicated syrups, suspended the manufacturer’s license, and launched criminal investigations into the companies involved.

The incident led to widespread criticism of India’s drug regulatory system and renewed concerns over pharmaceutical quality control. It also drew international attention, as it followed earlier cases of diethylene glycol poisoning linked to Indian-made syrups in Gambia and Uzbekistan.

=== Indonesia ===
In 2022, deaths of nearly 100 children in Indonesia, were reported to be linked to cough syrup and liquid medication. The syrup contained "unacceptable amounts" of diethylene glycol and ethylene glycol, linked to acute kidney injuries (AKI). In October, health officials reported around 200 cases of AKI in children, most of who were aged under five. Indonesia temporarily banned the sale and prescription of all syrup and liquid medicines as it was not clear if these medicines were imported or locally produced.

In November 2023, Afi Farma's chief executive and three other officials, whose cough syrup was linked to the deaths were sentenced to two-year prison sentences and fined 1bn Indonesian rupiah ($63,029; £51,7130) each.

=== Marshall Islands and Micronesia ===
In April 2023, World Health Organization (WHO) reported that, Guaifenesin TG syrup manufactured by QP Pharmachem Ltd in Punjab, India, had been found to contain "unacceptable amounts of diethylene glycol and ethylene glycol" in tested samples. Sudhir Pathak, managing director of QP Pharmachem, claimed that the batch of 18,346 bottles had been exported to Cambodia after obtaining all necessary regulatory approvals and that he was unaware of how the product had ended up in the Marshall Islands and Micronesia.

=== Pakistan ===
In December 2012, toxic cough syrup led to a death toll of between 16 and 30 in Gujranwala, while in November of that year, at least 19 individuals in Lahore suffered the same fate. Following an inquiry, Tyno cough syrup, produced and distributed by Reko Pharma in Lahore, was identified as the cause of the fatalities in Lahore. Many of the victims from the two incidents were drug addicts seeking intoxication. The syrup was later found to contain too much dextromethorphan, a cough suppressant.

=== Panama ===
From 2006 to May 2007, 365 deaths were reported in Panama. The diethylene glycol originated from a Chinese manufacturer, which exported it as industrial "TD glycerin" under a shelf life of one year. The letters "TD" were shorthand for "substitute" in Chinese. When Panama-based Medicom received the product from a Spanish trader, it changed the name to "glycerine" and the expiration date to four years before selling it to the government of Panama. Neither the trading companies involved nor the government lab in Panama that processed the ingredient tested the substance for verification. Chinese authorities said they would no longer allow the name "TD glycerin" to be used. One of the country's officials overseeing food and drug safety was sentenced to death in late May on charges related to the scandal. The Panama government detained several officials as well as employees of Medicom and set up a $6-million fund for the victims.

=== The Gambia ===
In October 2022, the WHO announced a link between four paediatric cough syrups from one Indian pharmaceutical company and the deaths of 66 children in The Gambia from kidney failure. The products (Promethazine Oral Solution, Kofexmalin Baby Cough Syrup, Makoff Baby Cough Syrup, and Magrip N Cold Syrup) are believed to be contaminated with diethylene glycol and/or ethylene glycol. The products involved were manufactured by Maiden Pharmaceuticals of India in December 2021.

This has led to Maiden Pharmaceuticals' products being banned in The Gambia; a probe by the CDSCO and volunteers from health agencies in The Gambia going door to door in an urgent recall.

In December 2022, a parliamentary committee in The Gambia recommended prosecution of the Indian company, Maiden Pharmaceuticals. It also recommended banning all products by the firm in the country.

Indian authorities started conducting an inquiry into an April 2023 allegation that a pharmaceutical regulator in Haryana state, who holds a senior position in the state health department, accepted a bribe and switched samples of contaminated cough syrup before the state government laboratory tested them. The cough syrup in question was produced by Maiden Pharmaceuticals, and it has been implicated in child deaths in Gambia. Tests conducted by two independent laboratories on behalf of the WHO confirmed the presence of lethal toxins—ethylene glycol and diethylene glycol in the syrup. Indian authorities, however, did not find any toxins, but did identify labeling issues with Maiden Pharmaceuticals' cough syrup. Naresh Kumar Goyal, the founder of Maiden Pharmaceuticals, has previously denied any wrongdoing in the production of the syrup.

=== Uzbekistan ===
In December 2022, Uzbekistan's health ministry said that 18 children died from renal problems and acute respiratory disease after drinking cough syrup manufactured by Indian drug maker Marion Biotech. The statement did not specify over what time period the deaths occurred. As a result, Marion Biotech, was suspended from Pharmexcil, an Indian government-linked trade group. As a result, state security police in Uzbekistan arrested four people.

Sources told Reuters that Marion purchased industrial-grade propylene glycol as an ingredient from Maya Chemtech India, which is not licensed to sell pharmaceutical-grade materials. Maya is not facing charges but the investigation is ongoing. Marion did not test the ingredient it purchased.

The Indian government has mandated that after June 2023, cough syrup manufacturers must have their products tested before exporting them. These companies are required to obtain a certificate of analysis from a government-approved laboratory. A list of approved laboratories, both at the central and state government level, was provided where the samples can be tested.

=== Cameroon ===
The Naturcold brand of cough syrup from India was associated with the deaths of multiple children in Cameroon. WHO testing on June 27, 2023, revealed alarming levels of diethylene glycol in Naturcold, reaching as high as 28.6% – over 200 times the acceptable limit, which should not exceed 0.1%. This highly toxic solvent, normally used in air-conditioners and fridges, can lead to severe symptoms, including acute kidney injury and even death if ingested.

The packaging of the deadly medicine falsely claimed that it was produced by a British company called Fraken International (England), but no such company exists in the UK. The actual manufacturer was Riemann Private Ltd, an Indian company based in Indore, and it appeared to be exported to global markets, including Cameroon, by another Indian company, Wellona Pharma, based in Surat, Gujarat. The UK’s Medicines and Healthcare products Regulatory Agency keeps an eye on counterfeit claims of UK origin made by foreign pharmaceutical companies, as such claims are used to add credibility to otherwise adulterated, unlicensed, or substandard medicines.

Riemann Pvt Ltd is under investigation and faces potential disciplinary action from the Indian drug regulator, the Central Drugs Standard Control Organisation. Despite the ongoing investigation, the company continues its operations and drug manufacturing activities.

=== Worldwide ===
The World Health Organization (WHO) is addressing the global threat of toxic cough syrups that have caused the deaths of more than 300 children across multiple countries in 2022 and 2023. The WHO is working with six additional countries, bringing the total to 15 countries, to track these dangerous medicines. The WHO team lead said that tainted syrups are an ongoing risk. He cautioned that the presence of contaminated medicines could persist for several years, as warehouses may still contain barrels of adulterated propylene glycol. The manufacturers that exported the syrup to other countries in the current spate of incidents are four Indian manufacturers (Maiden Pharmaceuticals, Marion Biotech, QP Pharmachem, and Synercar), one Chinese manufacturer (Fraken Group) and one Pakistani manufacturer (Pharmix Laboratories). Safety alerts have been issued by government agencies in the affected countries, as well as by countries conducting tests on their behalf and the WHO, while investigations into the matter continue. The WHO has urged countries to enhance surveillance and offer support to countries lacking testing resources.

== See also ==
- List of medicine contamination incidents
