= Scientific Protein Laboratories =

Bio-pharmaceutical company

Scientific Protein Laboratories is a bio-pharmaceutical company established in Waunakee, Wisconsin in 1976 by Oscar Mayer.

== History ==
In 2004 SPL was acquired by Arsenal Capital Partners for $81 million, today. In 2014 it was acquired by the Chinese company Shenzhen Hepalink Pharmaceutical. The company was involved in, along with other pharmaceutical companies, the 2008 Chinese heparin adulteration.
