= Methanol toxicity =

Medical condition (poisoning)

- Other names: Methanol poisoning, methanol overdose
- Molecular structure of methanol
- Specialty: Emergency medicine, toxicology
- Symptoms: Decreased level of consciousness, ataxia, vomiting, abdominal pain, specific smell on the breath
- Complications: Blindness, kidney failure, death
- Causes: Methanol (such as found in windshield washer fluid)
- Diagnostic method: Blood acidosis, increased osmol gap, methanol blood level
- Differential diagnosis: Infections, exposure to other toxic alcohols, serotonin syndrome, diabetic ketoacidosis
- Prevention: Consuming safe alcoholic beverages
- Treatment: Antidote, hemodialysis
- Medication: Fomepizole, ethanol
- Prognosis: Good with early treatment
- Frequency: 1,700 cases per year (US)

Methanol toxicity (also methanol poisoning) is poisoning from methanol, characteristically via ingestion. Symptoms may include an altered/decreased level of consciousness, poor or no coordination, vomiting, abdominal pain, and a specific smell on the breath. Decreased vision may start as early as twelve hours after exposure. Long-term outcomes may include blindness and kidney failure. Ingestion of as little as 3.16 grams of methanol can cause irreversible optic nerve damage, and the oral LD50 for humans is estimated to be 56.2 grams of pure methanol.

Methanol poisoning most commonly occurs following the drinking of tainted alcoholic beverages made with windshield washer fluid. This may be accidental or as part of an attempted suicide. Toxicity may also rarely occur through extensive skin exposure or breathing in fumes. When the body breaks down methanol it results in the creation of metabolite byproducts such as formaldehyde, formic acid, and formate which cause much of the toxicity. The diagnosis may be suspected when there is acidosis or an increased osmol gap and confirmed by directly measuring blood levels. Other conditions that can produce similar symptoms include infections, exposure to other toxic alcohols, serotonin syndrome, and diabetic ketoacidosis.

Early treatment increases the chance of a good outcome. Treatment consists of stabilizing the person and using an antidote. The preferred antidote is fomepizole, with ethanol used if this is not available. Hemodialysis may also be used in those where there is organ damage or a high degree of acidosis. Other treatments may include sodium bicarbonate, folate, and thiamine.

Oral methanol toxicity is more common in the developing world. In 2013 more than 1700 cases occurred in the United States. Those affected are usually adults and males. Toxicity to methanol has been described as early as 1856.

== Signs and symptoms ==
The initial symptoms of methanol intoxication include central nervous system depression, headache, dizziness, nausea, lack of coordination, and confusion. Sufficiently large doses cause unconsciousness and death. The initial symptoms of methanol exposure are usually less severe than the symptoms from the ingestion of a similar quantity of ethanol. Once the initial symptoms have passed, a second set of symptoms arises, from 10 to as many as 30 hours after the initial exposure, that may include blurring, photophobia, snowstorm vision or complete loss of vision, acidosis, and putaminal hemorrhages, an uncommon but serious complication. These symptoms result from the accumulation of toxic levels of formate in the blood, and may progress to death by respiratory failure. Physical examination may show tachypnea, and eye examination may show dilated pupils with hyperemia of the optic disc and retinal edema.

== Cause ==
Ingestion of as little as 4–15 mL of methanol has reportedly caused irreversible optic nerve damage, and the oral LD50 for humans is estimated to be 56.2 grams of pure methanol. The toxicity is attenuated (not removed) when methanol is ingested with ethanol (such as in the case of tainted drinks), increasing the doses required for symptoms and death. The reference dose for methanol is 0.5 mg/kg/day.

Methanol is not produced in toxic amounts by fermentation of agricultural products or by subsequent distillation. However, in modern times, in order to comply with regulations reducing the methanol amount is sometimes desired. This can be achieved with the use of a molecular sieve.

=== Surrogate alcohol ===
Because of its similarities in both appearance and odor to ethanol (the alcohol in beverages) or isopropyl alcohol, it is difficult to differentiate between the three. As a result, ethanol is sometimes denatured (adulterated), and made poisonous, by the addition of methanol. The result is known as methylated spirit, "meths" (British use) or "metho" (Australian slang).

Despite its poisonous content, denatured alcohol is sometimes consumed as a surrogate alcohol.

== Mechanism ==
Methanol is toxic by two mechanisms. First, methanol (whether it enters the body by ingestion, inhalation, or absorption through the skin) can be fatal due to its CNS depressant properties in the same manner as ethanol poisoning. Second, in a process of toxication, it is metabolized to formic acid (which is present as the formate ion) via formaldehyde in a process initiated by the enzyme alcohol dehydrogenase in the liver. Methanol is converted to formaldehyde via alcohol dehydrogenase and formaldehyde is converted to formic acid (formate) via aldehyde dehydrogenase. The conversion to formate via ALDH proceeds completely, with no detectable formaldehyde remaining. Formate is toxic because it inhibits mitochondrial cytochrome c oxidase, causing hypoxia at the cellular level, and metabolic acidosis, among a variety of other metabolic disturbances.

== Treatment ==
Methanol poisoning can be treated with fomepizole or ethanol. Both drugs act to reduce the action of alcohol dehydrogenase on methanol by means of competitive inhibition. Ethanol, the active ingredient in alcoholic beverages, acts as a competitive inhibitor by more effectively binding and saturating the alcohol dehydrogenase enzyme in the liver, thus blocking the binding of methanol. Methanol is excreted by the kidneys without being converted into the toxic metabolites formaldehyde and formic acid. Alcohol dehydrogenase instead enzymatically converts ethanol to acetaldehyde. Additional treatment may include sodium bicarbonate for metabolic acidosis, and hemodialysis or hemodiafiltration to remove methanol and formate from the blood. Folinic acid or folic acid is also administered to enhance the metabolism of formate.

== History ==
There are cases of methanol resistance, such as that of Michael Malloy, whom a group of acquaintances tried and failed to poison with methanol in the early 1930s.

In December 2016, 78 people died in Irkutsk, Russia, from methanol poisoning after ingesting a counterfeit body lotion that was primarily methanol rather than ethanol as labeled. The body lotion, before the event, had been used as a cheap substitute for vodka by the impoverished people in the region despite warnings on the lotion's bottles that it was not safe for drinking and long-standing problems with alcohol poisoning across the country.

During the COVID-19 pandemic, Iranian media reported that nearly 300 people had died and over a thousand became ill due to methanol poisoning in the belief that drinking methanol could help with the disease. In the United States, the Food and Drug Administration discovered that several brands of hand sanitizer manufactured in Mexico during the pandemic contained methanol, and urged the public to avoid using the affected products.

In June 2025, 57 people were poisoned by tainted alcoholic beverages in Jordan. Nine people died from the incident. Jordanian Authorities arrested 12 individuals that are linked to the factory which manufactured the contaminated alcoholic beverages. All 12 were charged with murder and attempted murder.

== See also ==
- Ethylene glycol poisoning
