= Akos Vertes =

Hungarian-American biochemist and molecular biologist

- Education: Eötvös Loránd University
- Awards: Hillebrand Award
- Scientific career
- Fields: Biochemistry
- Workplaces: University of Antwerp; George Washington University

Akos Vertes is a Hungarian-American professor of chemistry, biochemistry and molecular biology at the George Washington University and an external member of the Hungarian Academy of Sciences.

== Early life and career ==
Vertes was born in Budapest, Hungary. He graduated from the Veres Pálné Gimnázium in 1971 and then got his B.S. and Ph.D. in chemistry from the Eötvös Loránd University in 1974 and 1979 respectively. In 1979 he was appointed research associate at the Hungarian Central Research Institute for Physics and in 1987 was promoted to senior research associate; from 1986 to 1989 he served as its Deputy Head. Until 1991 was an assistant professor at the University of Antwerp in Belgium.

In 1991 he immigrated to the United States and was hired by the George Washington University as an associate professor of Analytical chemistry. and was promoted to professor in 2000 and to Professor of Biochemistry and Molecular Biology in 2003.

In 1997 he became deputy chair of its Department of Chemistry. In 2002 he founded the W. M. Keck Institute for Proteomics Technology and Applications in Washington, D.C. and became co-director. From 2003 to 2008 he also worked as an adjunct professor at the National Institutes of Health in Bethesda, Maryland.

In 2014 Akos led GWU's Columbian College of Arts and Sciences team to investigate chemical and biological threats.

== Research and inventions ==
In 2008 Akos Vertes had worked with Peter Nemes to develop laser ablation electrospray ionization (LAESI) for mass spectrometry (MS), a miniature version of the previous lasers requiring only a desk-sized space in the lab. Four years later this technology, which in the future became known as the LAESI-DP 1000 Direct Ionization System, was ranked as one of the 100 most technologically significant products of 2012 by the R&D Magazine and was ranked top 10 invention by The Scientist.

In 2009 Vertes and colleagues applied the LAESI-MS technology for the analysis of single living cells.

In 2012 he worked with Protea Biosciences to develop a laser-based analytical system that can detect explosives and illegal drugs.

In 2015 he had created a nano-device called REDIchip that, in combination with MS, was capable to detect materials made up of as little as 100,000 molecules.

== Awards ==
- 2007 – Oscar and Shoshana Trachtenberg Prize
- 2012 – Hillebrand Award
- 2013 – Fellow of the National Academy of Inventors
- 2016 – Distinguished Researcher Award, awarded by The George Washington University
- 2022 – Elected Fellow of the American Association for the Advancement of Science (AAAS)
- 2025 – Elected External Member of the Hungarian Academy of Sciences, Hungary (MTA)
