= S. E. Massengill Company =

Defunct pharmaceutical manufacturer

S. E. Massengill Company was a pharmaceutical company founded in 1898 by Samuel Evans Massengill, who graduated from the University of Nashville Medical School but decided to manufacture drugs rather than practice medicine himself. By 1937, it employed more than two hundred people in Bristol, Tennessee, including six graduate pharmaceutical chemists.

== Elixir sulfanilamide scandal ==
The company was responsible for the elixir sulfanilamide disaster of 1937, described as one of the most consequential mass poisonings of the 20th century. Elixir sulfanilamide was formulated with diethylene glycol as a solvent. The company claimed to have been unaware of the toxicity of diethylene glycol, despite the existence of published studies describing its dangerous properties. The elixir was released with no safety testing, leading to the deaths of at least one hundred people in fifteen states. The resulting scandal led to the passage of the 1938 Federal Food, Drug, and Cosmetic Act.

== Mergers and acquisitions ==
Massengill continued to operate as a family-owned pharmaceutical firm until it was acquired in 1971 by Beecham plc., itself later merged into SmithKline Beecham in 1989 and since 2000 into GlaxoSmithKline.

On December 20, 2011, Massengill was sold to Prestige Brands for £426 million ($660 million).

== See also ==
- List of medicine contamination incidents
