= Fomepizole =

Medication

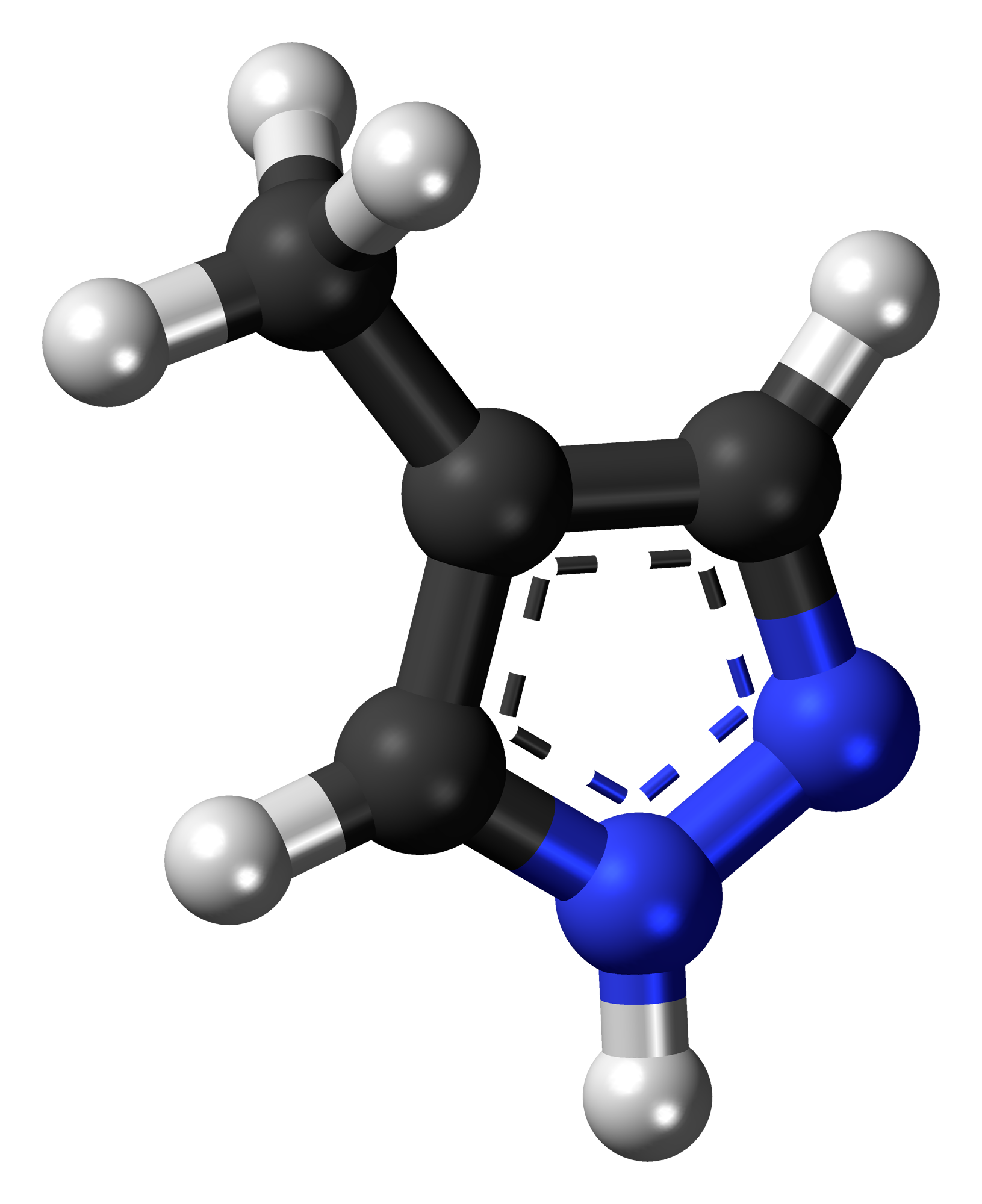
- Chemical structure of fomepizole

Clinical data
- Pronunciation: /ˌfoʊˈmɛpɪzoʊl/
- Trade names: Antizol, others
- Other names: 4-Methylpyrazole
- AHFS/Drugs.com: Monograph
- License data: US DailyMed: Fomepizole
- Routes of administration: Intravenous
- Drug class: Alcohol dehydrogenase inhibitor
- ATC code: V03AB34 (WHO)

Legal status
- Legal status: AU: S4 (Prescription only); US: ℞-only

Identifiers
- IUPAC name: 4-Methyl-1H-pyrazole
- CAS Number: 7554-65-6
- PubChem CID: 3406
- DrugBank: DB01213
- ChemSpider: 3289
- UNII: 83LCM6L2BY
- KEGG: D00707
- ChEBI: CHEBI:5141
- ChEMBL: ChEMBL1308
- CompTox Dashboard (EPA): DTXSID3040649
- ECHA InfoCard: 100.028.587

Chemical and physical data
- Formula: C_{4}H_{6}N_{2}
- Molar mass: 82.106 g·mol^{−1}
- 3D model (JSmol): Interactive image
- Density: 0.99 g/cm^{3}
- Boiling point: 204 to 207 °C (399 to 405 °F) (at 97,3 kPa)
- SMILES: CC1=CNN=C1
- InChI: InChI=1S/C4H6N2/c1-4-2-5-6-3-4/h2-3H,1H3,(H,5,6); Key:RIKMMFOAQPJVMX-UHFFFAOYSA-N

Fomepizole, also known as 4-methylpyrazole, is a medication used to treat methanol and ethylene glycol poisoning. It may be used alone or together with hemodialysis. It is given by injection into a vein.

Common side effects include headache, nausea, sleepiness, and unsteadiness. It is unclear if use during pregnancy causes risk to a fetus. Fomepizole works by blocking the enzyme that converts methanol and ethylene glycol to their toxic breakdown products.

Fomepizole was approved for medical use in the United States in 1997. It is on the World Health Organization's List of Essential Medicines.

== Medical uses ==
Fomepizole is used to treat ethylene glycol and methanol poisoning. It acts to inhibit the conversion of these alcohols into their respective aldehydes by alcohol dehydrogenase. This prevents further conversion to the more active toxic metabolites oxalic acid and formic acid, respectively.

Fomepizole is most effective when given soon after ingestion of ethylene glycol or methanol. Delaying its administration allows for the generation of harmful metabolites.

== Adverse effects ==
Common side effects associated with fomepizole use include headache and nausea.

== Interactions ==
=== Interaction with ethanol ===
Concurrent use with ethanol is contraindicated because fomepizole is known to prolong the half-life of ethanol via inhibiting its metabolism to acetaldehyde by alcohol dehydrogenase.

== Pharmacology ==
=== Mechanism of action ===
Fomepizole is a competitive inhibitor of the enzyme alcohol dehydrogenase, found in the liver. This enzyme plays a key role in the metabolism of ethylene glycol, and of methanol.

- Ethylene glycol is first metabolized to glycolaldehyde by alcohol dehydrogenase. Glycolaldehyde then undergoes further oxidation to glycolate, glyoxylate, and oxalate. Glycolate and oxalate are the primary toxins responsible for the metabolic acidosis, and for the renal damage, seen in ethylene glycol poisoning.
- Methanol is first metabolized to formaldehyde by alcohol dehydrogenase. Formaldehyde then undergoes further oxidation, via formaldehyde dehydrogenase, to become formic acid. Formic acid is the primary toxin responsible for the metabolic acidosis, and for the visual disturbances, associated with methanol poisoning.

By competitively inhibiting the first enzyme, alcohol dehydrogenase, in the metabolism of ethylene glycol and methanol, fomepizole slows the production of the toxic metabolites. The slower rate of metabolite production allows the liver to process and excrete the metabolites as they are produced, limiting the accumulation in tissues such as the kidney and eye. As a result, much of the organ damage is avoided.

=== Pharmacokinetics ===
==== Absorption and distribution ====
Fomepizole distributes rapidly into total body water. The volume of distribution is between 0.6 and 1.02 L/kg. The therapeutic concentration is from 8.2 to 24.6 mg (100 to 300 micromoles) per liter. Peak concentration following single oral doses of 7 to 50 mg/kg of body weight occurred in 1 to 2 hours. The half-life varies with dose, so has not been calculated.

==== Metabolism and elimination ====
Hepatic – the primary metabolite is 4-carboxypyrazole (about 80 to 85% of an administered dose). Other metabolites include the pyrazoles 4-hydroxymethylpyrazole and the N -glucuronide conjugates of 4-carboxypyrazole and 4-hydroxymethylpyrazole.

Following multiple doses, fomepizole rapidly induces its own metabolism via the cytochrome P450 mixed-function oxidase system.

In healthy volunteers, 1.0 to 3.5% of an administered dose was excreted unchanged in the urine. The metabolites also are excreted unchanged in the urine.

Fomepizole is dialyzable.

== Other uses ==
4-methylpyrazole is used as a ligand in coordination chemistry.
