= Elixir sulfanilamide =

Antibiotic preparation responsible for a mass poisoning in 1937

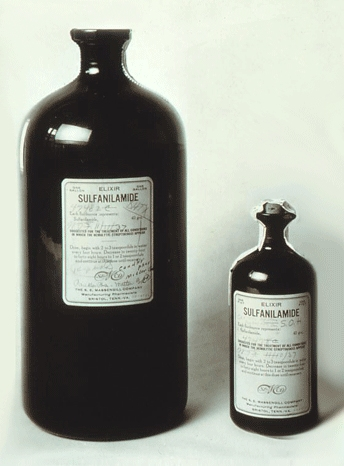
Bottles of elixir sulfanilamide

Elixir sulfanilamide was an improperly prepared sulfonamide antibiotic that caused mass poisoning in the United States in 1937. It is believed to have killed 107 people. The public outcry caused by this incident and other similar disasters led to the passing of the 1938 Federal Food, Drug, and Cosmetic Act, which significantly increased the Food and Drug Administration's powers to regulate drugs.

== History ==
Aside from the Pure Food and Drug Act of 1906 and the Harrison Act of 1914 banning the sale of some narcotic drugs, there was no federal regulatory control in the United States of America for drugs until Congress enacted the 1938 Food, Drug, and Cosmetic Act in response to the elixir sulfanilamide poisonings.

In 1937, S. E. Massengill Company, a pharmaceutical manufacturer, created an oral preparation of sulfanilamide using diethylene glycol (DEG) as the solvent or excipient, and called the preparation "Elixir Sulfanilamide". DEG is poisonous to humans and other mammals, but Harold Watkins, the company's chief pharmacist and chemist, was not aware of this. Although the first case of a fatality from the related ethylene glycol occurred in 1930 and studies had been published in medical journals stating DEG could cause kidney damage or failure, its toxicity was not widely known prior to the incident.

Watkins simply mixed raspberry flavoring into the powdered drug and then dissolved the mixture in DEG. Animal testing was not required by law, and Massengill performed none; there were no regulations at the time requiring premarket safety testing of drugs.

The company started selling and distributing the medication in September 1937. By October 11, the American Medical Association had received a report of several deaths caused by the medication. The Food and Drug Administration was notified, and an extensive search was conducted to recover the distributed medicine. Frances Oldham Kelsey assisted on a research project that verified that the DEG solvent was responsible for the fatal adverse effects. At least 100 deaths were blamed on the medication.

The owner of Massengill, when pressed to admit some measure of culpability, answered, "We have been supplying a legitimate professional demand and not once could have foreseen the unlooked-for results. I do not feel that there was any responsibility on our part." Massengill executives ultimately admitted that their safety testing only examined appearance, flavor, and fragrance, rather than actual toxicity. Watkins, the chemist, died by suicide while awaiting trial.

A woman wrote to President Franklin D. Roosevelt grieving the death of her daughter: "The first time I ever had occasion to call in a doctor for [Joan] and she was given Elixir of Sulfanilamide. All that is left to us is the caring for her little grave. Even the memory of her is mixed with sorrow for we can see her little body tossing to and fro and hear that little voice screaming with pain and it seems as though it would drive me insane. ... It is my plea that you will take steps to prevent such sales of drugs that will take little lives and leave such suffering behind and such a bleak outlook on the future as I have tonight."

Congress responded to public outrage by passing the Federal Food, Drug, and Cosmetic Act of 1938, which required companies to perform animal safety tests on their proposed new drugs and submit the data to the FDA before being allowed to market their products. The Massengill Company paid a minimum fine under provisions of the 1906 Pure Food and Drugs Act, which prohibited labeling the preparation an "elixir" if it contained no ethanol.

== See also ==
- Human subject research legislation in the United States
- List of medicine contamination incidents
- 1985 Austrian diethylene glycol wine scandal
