= Eduardo Arias =

Panamanian whistleblower

Eduardo Arias (1956 – 1 August 2020) was a Panamanian Guna, whose discovery of contaminated toothpaste saved lives by alerting the public to potentially poisonous products purchased from the People's Republic of China (PRC).

== Early life ==
Arias was born and grew up in a reservation in one of the San Blas Islands.

== Toothpaste recall ==
On 5 May 2007, upon purchasing a tube of toothpaste from the Vendela Discount Store in Panama City, Arias discovered that it contained diethylene glycol (DEG), a toxic substance that had recently caused deaths as an ingredient of cough syrup. On 7 May, Arias reported his findings to the Panamanian Ministry of Health. On 10 May, Camilo Alleyne, the top health official of the Panamanian government announced that DEG had been found in toothpaste being sold in Panama City. A national uproar resulted in an investigation, the results of which indicated that PRC manufacturers were systematically using DEG as a thickening agent (in place of glycerin, which is more commonly used, but is more expensive) at levels that were far above safety limits. Investigations also indicated that counterfeiters in the PRC sometimes used false labels for Colgate and Sensodyne brands.

Despite the PRC's claims that Mainland Chinese consumers had not suffered ill effects from these products, the PRC government did take action to prevent further use of DEG in its exports. Although Arias' discovery led to product recalls and warnings around the world, his contribution was overlooked until an article in The New York Times appeared on 1 October 2007.

== Later life ==
Arias lived alone in Panama City. He was listed as one of the "People Who Mattered" in the Person of the Year section of Time magazine in 2007. He died from cancer in August 2020.
