= 2008 Chinese heparin adulteration =

Medicine contamination incidents

2008 Chinese heparin adulteration, refers to heparin adulteration incidents that occurred in the United States of America in 2008. Pharmaceutical company Baxter International subcontracted the creation of precursor chemicals of heparin to Scientific Protein Laboratories, an American company with production facilities located in China. Scientific Protein Laboratories then used counterfeit precursors to create the chemicals ordered. Baxter then sold this adulterated heparin in the US, which killed 81 people, and left 785 severely injured. This caught the attention of the media and the USA Food and Drug Administration leading to numerous ongoing lawsuits.

== Overview ==
The raw material for the recalled heparin batches was processed in China from pig's intestines by the American pharmaceutical firm Scientific Protein Laboratories. The U.S. Food and Drug Administration was quoted as stating that at least 81 deaths were believed to be linked to a raw heparin ingredient imported from the People's Republic of China, and that they had also received 785 reports of serious injuries associated with the drug's use. According to The New York Times, "problems with heparin reported to the agency include difficulty breathing, nausea, vomiting, excessive sweating and rapidly falling blood pressure that in some cases led to life-threatening shock."

In March 2008, due to contamination of the raw heparin stock imported from mainland China, major recalls of heparin, a substance widely used as an injectable anticoagulant, were announced by the U.S. Food and Drug Administration (FDA).

Upon investigation of these adverse events by the FDA, academic institutions, and the involved pharmaceutical companies, the contaminant was identified as an "over-sulfated" derivative of chondroitin sulfate, a closely related substance obtained from mammal or fish cartilage and often used as a treatment for arthritis. Since over-sulfated chondroitin is not a naturally occurring molecule, costs a fraction of true heparin starting material, and mimics the in-vitro properties of heparin, the counterfeit was almost certainly intentional as opposed to an accidental lapse in manufacturing. The raw heparin batches were found to have been cut from 2–60% with chondroitin and motivation for the adulteration was attributed to a combination of cost savings and a shortage of suitable pigs in mainland China.

When the FDA conducted an inspection of Baxter's Chinese heparin supplier, it found serious deficiencies at the facility, which the FDA detailed in a warning letter.

The warning letter detailed that the company failed to monitor changes in the impurity profile of incoming heparin active raw material, to adequately investigate out-of-specification results, to document actual processing steps in batch records, to validate all critical steps in the process, to qualify all suppliers, and to use valid methods to test products.

The FDA has stated that it does not have the funds nor bear the responsibility to inspect on a regular basis overseas upstream processors of finished active pharmaceutical ingredients such as heparin. However, according to the internationally harmonized guideline, ICH Q7, API manufacturers are fully responsible for qualifying their suppliers through on-site audits, testing, and regular communications.

== See also ==
- List of medicine contamination incidents
