= Diethylene glycol =

Chemical compound

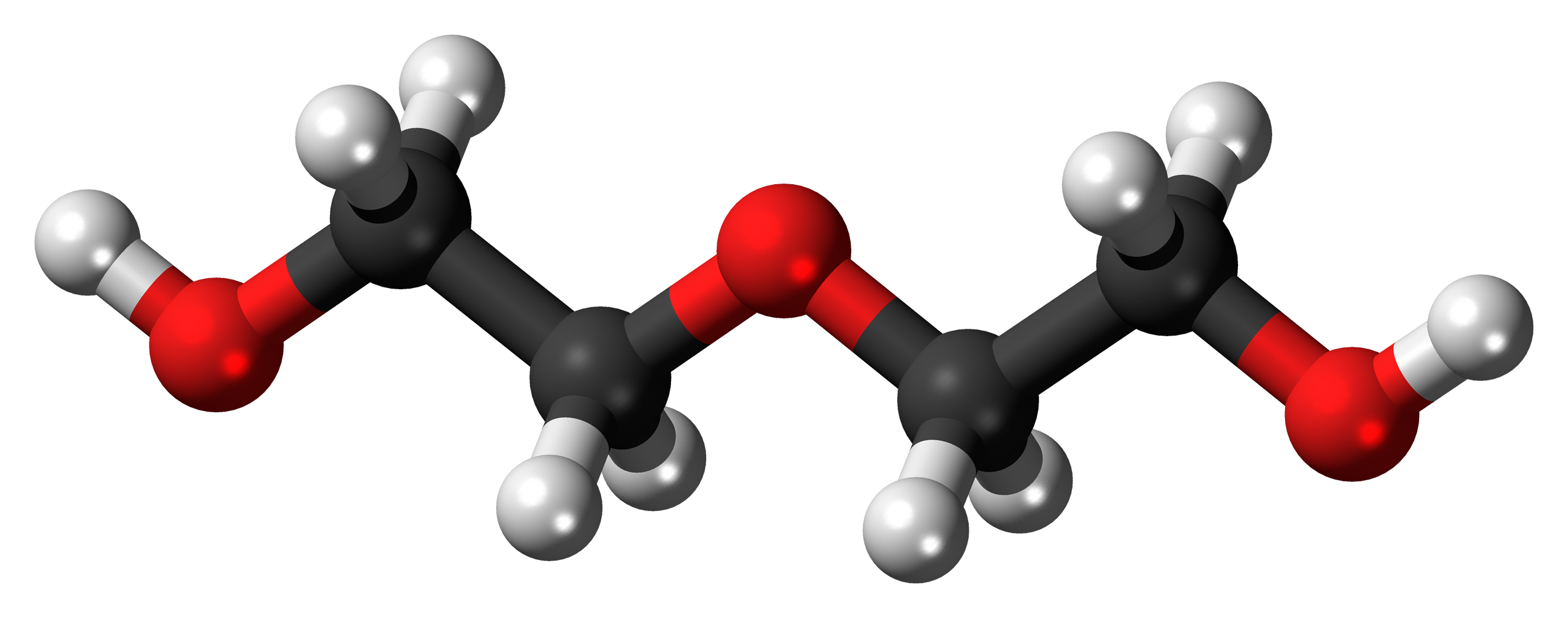

Names
- IUPAC name 2,2′-Oxydiethanol
- Other names 2,2′-Oxybis(ethan-1-ol); 2-(2-Hydroxyethoxy)ethan-1-ol; Diethylene glycol Ethylene diglycol Diglycol; 2,2′-Oxybisethanol; 2,2′-Oxydiethanol; 3-Oxa-1,5-pentanediol; Dihydroxy diethyl ether Digenos; Digol

Identifiers
CAS Number	111-46-6
3D model (JSmol)	Interactive image
ChEBI	CHEBI:46807
ChemSpider	13835180
ECHA InfoCard	100.003.521
KEGG	C14689
PubChem CID	8117
UNII	61BR964293
CompTox Dashboard (EPA)	DTXSID8020462
- InChI: InChI=1S/C4H10O3/c5-1-3-7-4-2-6/h5-6H,1-4H2 Key: MTHSVFCYNBDYFN-UHFFFAOYSA-N; InChI=1/C4H10O3/c5-1-3-7-4-2-6/h5-6H,1-4H2 Key: MTHSVFCYNBDYFN-UHFFFAOYAK
- SMILES: OCCOCCO

Properties
Chemical formula	C_{4}H_{10}O_{3}
Molar mass	106.12 g/mol
Appearance	Colorless liquid
Density	1.118 g/mL
Melting point	−10.45 °C (13.19 °F; 262.70 K)
Boiling point	245 °C (473 °F; 518 K)
Solubility in water	miscible
Vapor pressure	0.01 mmHg (at 30 °C)

Hazards
- Occupational safety and health (OHS/OSH)
Main hazards	Flammable, mildly toxic
- GHS labelling
Pictograms	(GHS08: Health hazard) (GHS07: Exclamation mark)
NFPA 704 (fire diamond)	2 1 1
Flash point	124 °C (255 °F; 397 K)
Autoignition temperature	224 °C (435 °F; 497 K)
- Lethal dose or concentration (LD, LC)
LD_{50} (median dose)	12565 mg/kg (oral, rat); 11890 mg/kg (dermal, rat)
Safety data sheet (SDS)	Fisher Scientific

Related compounds
Related diols	Ethylene glycol; Triethylene glycol; Polyethylene glycol
- Except where otherwise noted, data are given for materials in their standard state (at 25 °C [77 °F], 100 kPa). verify (what is ?) Infobox references

Diethylene glycol (DEG) is an organic compound with the formula (HOCH_{2}CH_{2})_{2}O. It is a colorless, practically odorless, and hygroscopic liquid with a sweetish taste. It is a four-carbon dimer of ethylene glycol. It is miscible in water, alcohol, ether, acetone, and ethylene glycol. DEG is a widely used solvent. It can be a normal ingredient in various consumer products, and it can be a contaminant. DEG has also been misused to sweeten wine and beer, and to viscosify oral and topical pharmaceutical products. Its use has resulted in many epidemics of poisoning since the early 20th century.

== Preparation ==
DEG is produced by the partial hydrolysis of ethylene oxide. Depending on the conditions, varying amounts of DEG and related glycols are produced. The resulting product is two ethylene glycol molecules joined by an ether bond.

"Diethylene glycol is derived as a co-product with ethylene glycol (MEG) and triethylene glycol. The industry generally operates to maximize MEG production. Ethylene glycol is by far the largest volume of the glycol products in a variety of applications. Availability of DEG will depend on demand for derivatives of the primary product, ethylene glycol, rather than on DEG market requirements."

== Structure of DEG and related polyols ==
Diethylene glycol is one of several glycols derived from ethylene oxide. Glycols related to and co-produced with diethylene glycol and having the formula HOCH_{2}CH_{2}(OCH_{2}CH_{2})_{n}OH are:

- n = 0 ethylene glycol ("antifreeze"); monoethylene glycol MEG
- n = 1 DEG
- n = 2 triethylene glycol, TEG, or triglycol
- n = 3 tetraethylene glycol
- n = 4 pentaethylene glycol
- n > 4 polyethylene glycol

These compounds are all hydrophilic, more so than most diols, by virtue of the ether functionality.

== Uses ==
Diethylene glycol is used in the manufacture of saturated and unsaturated polyester resins, polyurethanes, and plasticizers. DEG is a precursor to morpholine and 1,4-dioxane. It is a solvent for nitrocellulose, resins, dyes, oils, and other organic compounds. It is a humectant for tobacco, cork, printing ink, and glue. It is also a component of brake fluid, lubricants, wallpaper strippers, artificial fog and haze solutions, and heating/cooking fuel. In personal care products (e.g. skin cream and lotions and deodorants), DEG is often replaced by selected diethylene glycol ethers. Most types of ethylene glycol antifreeze contain a few percent of diethylene glycol, present as a by-product of ethylene glycol production.

DEG is an important industrial desiccant. It absorbs water from natural gas, minimizing the formation of methane hydrates, which can block pipes.

== Toxicology ==
The toxicity of DEG was discovered in 1937. The toxic dose is 0.14 mg/kg body weight and the lethal dose between 1.0 and 1.63 g/kg. Some suggest that the LD_{50} in adults is about 1 mL/kg, while others suggest that that is the LD_{30}. Because of its adverse effects, DEG is rarely allowed in foods and drugs. The U.S. Code of Federal Regulations allows no more than 0.2% of diethylene glycol in polyethylene glycol when the latter is used as a food additive. In Australia, it is only allowed at less than 0.25% w/w of DEG as an impurity in polyethylene glycol (PEG), even in toothpaste.

Diethylene glycol has "moderate to low" acute toxicity in animal experiments. The LD_{50} for small mammals is between 2 and 25 g/kg, less toxic than its relative ethylene glycol but still capable of causing toxicity in humans (in high concentrations only). It appears that diethylene glycol may be more hazardous to humans than implied by oral toxicity data in laboratory animals.

=== Toxicokinetics ===
Although there is limited information about toxicokinetics in humans, observations in mass poisonings and experimental studies suggest the following information:

==== Absorption and distribution ====
The principal method of absorption is through oral ingestion. Dermal absorption is very low, unless it is administered on broken or damaged skin. After ingestion, DEG is absorbed via the gastrointestinal tract and distributed by the bloodstream throughout the body, reaching peak blood concentrations within 30 to 120 minutes. In the liver DEG is metabolized by enzymes.

==== Metabolism and elimination ====
At first, scientists thought that DEG was converted in the liver to ethylene glycol, which is poisonous because of the metabolic production of glycolic acid, glyoxylic acid, and ultimately oxalic acid. The major cause of ethylene glycol toxicity is the accumulation of glycolic acid in the body, but accumulation of calcium oxalate crystals in the kidneys can also lead to acute kidney failure. In the case of DEG, calcium oxalate crystal are not deposited in the kidneys, implying that ethylene glycol is not on the DEG metabolic pathway. Rat models suggest that DEG is metabolized in the liver by enzyme NAD-dependent alcohol dehydrogenase (ADH) to a hydrogen ion, NADH, and 2-hydroxyethoxyacetaldehyde (C_{4}H_{8}O_{3}). Shortly after that, 2-hydroxyethoxyacetaldehyde (C_{4}H_{8}O_{3}) is metabolized by the enzyme aldehyde dehydrogenase (ALDH) to the weak acid 2-hydroxyethoxyacetic acid (HEAA), chemical formula C_{4}H_{8}O_{4}. Later, HEAA leaves the liver through the bloodstream, being partially filtered in the kidneys for elimination.

=== Mechanisms ===
Based on available literature, scientists suggest that unmetabolized DEG and HEAA are partially reabsorbed through glomerular filtration. As a consequence, the weak acid HEAA and its metabolites may cause renal delay, leading to metabolic acidosis and further liver and kidney damage.

=== Signs and symptoms ===
The symptoms of poisoning typically occur in three characteristic intervals:

- First phase: Gastrointestinal symptoms, such as nausea, vomiting, abdominal pain, and diarrhea, develop. Some patients may develop early neurological symptoms like altered mental status, central nervous system depression, and coma, as well as mild hypotension.
- Second phase: In one to three days after ingestion (and depending on the dose ingested), patients develop a metabolic acidosis, which causes acute kidney failure, oliguria, increasing serum creatinine concentrations, and later anuria. Other symptoms reported and secondary to acidosis and/or kidney failure are: hypertension, tachycardia and other cardiac dysrhythmias, pancreatitis, and hyperkalemia or mild hyponatremia.
- Final phase: At least five to ten days after ingestion, most of the symptoms are related to neurological complications, such as: progressive lethargy, facial paralysis, dysphonia, dilated and nonreactive pupils, quadriplegia, and coma, leading to death.

=== Treatment ===
Fomepizole or ethanol should be quickly administered to prevent diethylene glycol being metabolized to the compound or compounds that cause renal damage.

- Fomepizole: an alcohol dehydrogenase (ADH) inhibitor with 8000 times more affinity than ethanol. This treatment has minimal adverse effects. However, it is very expensive (about $3000 U.S. per treatment).
- Ethanol: ethanol is a competitive ADH substrate. A constant blood concentration of 1 to 1.5 g/L (corresponding to 0.5 to 0.75 mg/L in the breath) should be maintained to acceptably saturate the enzyme. An initial dose of 0.6 to 0.7 g ethanol per kilogram body weight should be given (about 0.8 mL/kg or 0.013 fl.oz/lb). This will cause ethanol intoxication. To avoid adverse effects, frequent serum monitoring and dosage adjustments should be done.

For late diagnosis, when ethanol or fomepizole is ineffective, because DEG has already been metabolized, hemodialysis becomes the only treatment available. Hemodialysis may be administered either alone or in combination with ethanol or fomepizole.

=== Prognosis ===
The prognosis depends on prompt diagnosis and treatment, owing to the high mortality from DEG intoxication. Patients who survive but develop kidney failure remain dialysis-dependent. All patients are likely to suffer significant morbidity.

== Epidemiology ==
The physical properties of diethylene glycol make it an excellent counterfeit for pharmaceutical-grade glycerine (also called glycerol) or propylene glycol, and has caused many deaths in different countries. Incidents include its use in China as a component of cheap toothpaste, and by winemakers in Europe as an adulterant to create a "sweet" wine. It has also been used in toxic cough syrup, resulting in many infant deaths.

=== 1937 – The Massengill incident (United States) ===
In 1937, S. E. Massengill Co. (a Tennessee drug company), manufactured sulfanilamide dissolved with diethylene glycol, to create a liquid alternative of this drug. The company tested the new product, Elixir sulfanilamide, for viscosity, appearance and fragrance. At the time, the food and drug laws did not require toxicological analysis before releasing for sale. When 105 people died in 15 states during the months of September and October, the trail led back to the elixir, and the toxic potential of this chemical was revealed. This episode was the impetus for the Federal Food, Drug, and Cosmetic Act of 1938. This law, though extensively amended in subsequent years, remains the central foundation of FDA regulatory authority to the present day.

=== 1969 – South Africa ===
In Cape Town, South Africa, seven children developed vomiting, diarrhea, and dehydration, and died of kidney failure after administration of over-the-counter sedatives. Soon, patients started to present with anuria, acidic breathing, hepatomegaly, and unresponsiveness. Patients were treated with fluid hydration and correction of acidosis, but some were not able to survive. Postmortem examination revealed damage in the kidneys and liver, and laboratory testing found DEG instead of propylene glycol in the sedatives.

=== 1985 – Spain ===
Patients being treated for burns developed sudden anuric kidney failure. Further investigation revealed all patients were treated with topical silver sulfadiazine ointment that contained 7 g/kg of DEG. This event caused the death of five patients.

=== 1985 – Wine scandal (Austria) ===
During the month of July 1985, Austrian wines were found to contain up to 1,000 parts per million of DEG, giving them a desirable sweetness. Austrian wine was banned in many countries and the U.S. Bureau of Alcohol, Tobacco and Firearms started to test all imported wine.

In November, The New York Times published a wine recall that the Federal Government released after the Bureau of Alcohol, Tobacco and Firearms tested 1,000 bottles. 45 Austrian, 5 German and 12 Italian wines tested positive for DEG. Some wines contained less than 10 parts per million of DEG, a small amount that could not be detected by laboratory analysis in Europe. This triggered the installation of more sensitive laboratory equipment in Banafi laboratories, Italy, and stronger alcohol regulations in Austria.

After recalling millions of wine bottles, the Austrian Government experienced difficulty in finding a way to destroy the product. During September 1986, the Ministry of Public Works started testing a mixture of wine with salt to melt hazardous ice during winter. The primary results revealed that the mixture was more effective than using salt alone. The next year, an Austrian electric power plant (Österreichische Draukraftwerke) in Carinthia announced that technicians developed a way to produce energy through burning 30 million liters (7 million gallons) of contaminated wine.

=== 1986 – India ===
At a hospital in Bombay, India, patients were admitted to be treated for diverse health problems. Doctors prescribed glycerine for its osmotic diuretic effect, but patients started to develop kidney failure. Fourteen patients received hemodialysis, but the treatment failed. The episode resulted in the deaths of 21 patients and the discovery of glycerin contaminated with 18.5% v/v of DEG.

=== 1990 – Nigeria ===
During the summer months, 47 children were admitted to the Jos University teaching hospital, Nigeria, with anuria, fever and vomiting. The children later developed kidney failure and died. All the children had received paracetamol (acetaminophen) syrup to treat upper respiratory infections related with malaria. Once physicians identified a suspect paracetamol syrup, samples were shipped to the Centers for Disease Control and Prevention (CDC) in the U.S., which identified DEG. It was assumed that DEG was used as a substitute of propylene glycol, and this incident encouraged the Nigerian government to develop pharmaceutical quality control guidelines.

=== 1990–1992 – Bangladesh ===
In Bangladesh between 1990 and 1992, 339 children developed kidney failure, and most of them died, after being given paracetamol (acetaminophen) syrup contaminated with diethylene glycol. The outbreak forced the government to ban the sale of paracetamol elixirs in December 1992, causing a decline of 53% in the admission of patients with kidney failure and an 84% decline in admissions by unexplained kidney failure.

=== 1992 – Argentina ===
A propolis syrup manufactured by Huilen Laboratories in Buenos Aires, Argentina, contained between 24 and 66.5% DEG, and caused the death of 29 people.

=== 1995–1996 – Haiti ===
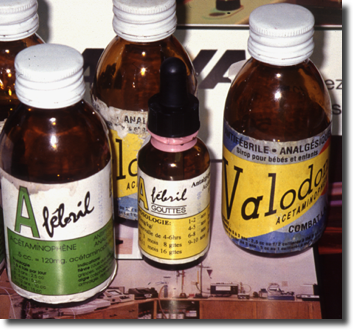
Medications contaminated with DEG

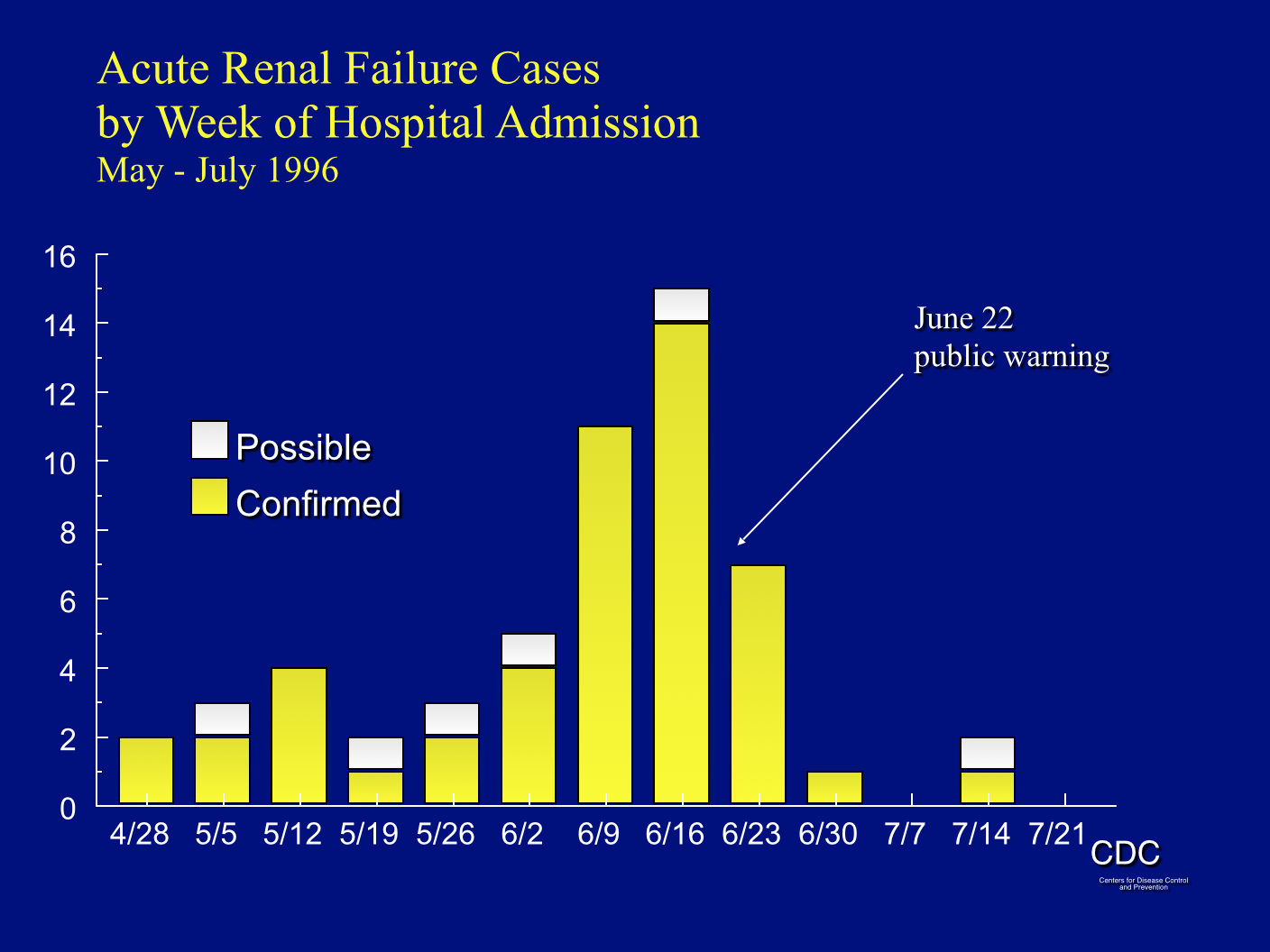
Haiti 1996 DEG epidemic curve

In the poorest country in the Western Hemisphere, disease outbreaks are not recognized unless widespread or unusual. Between November 1995 and June 1996, almost 109 children admitted to the University Hospital in Port-au-Prince, Haiti, presented with acute kidney failure. By June 1996, with no idea what was causing the epidemic, the Pan American Health Organization (PAHO) Haiti representative contacted the World Health Organization (WHO, the parent agency of PAHO), and WHO requested that the Centers for Disease Control and Prevention investigate.

Lead CDC investigator Dr. Katherine O'Brien conducted a case-control investigation, looking for potential clues to the epidemic. The study revealed a strong association between ingestion of two locally produced acetaminophen liquid products — Afébril and Valodon — and illness. Laboratory testing at CDC of samples taken from parents revealed significant contamination with DEG. The factory of the medication manufacturer, Pharval, was subsequently investigated by Dr. Joel Selanikio (also of CDC, and an Epidemic Intelligence Service classmate of Katherine O'Brien). Testing of medication samples taken from the factory samples by both CDC and by an independent commercial lab located in Miami, revealed contamination by DEG of 16.4% and higher. With the available technology of the era, the CDC determined the glycerin used in the syrup preparation was contaminated with approximately 24% DEG. As a result of the case-control findings, and subsequent investigation at the factory, public warnings were issued by the Ministry of Health and bottles of the two medications were taken from pharmacy shelves and destroyed. These measures quickly ended the advance of the epidemic.

Only 88 children deaths were recalled by doctors or had medical records. Nearly half of the victims were under the age of two.

Ending June 1996, the FDA had discovered counterfeit glycerin traced back to Chemical Trading and Consulting (a German broker), which bought 72 barrels of the syrup from Vos B.V., a Dutch company. Vos records revealed the syrup had been bought from Sinochem International Chemicals Company through a German trader, Metall-Chemie. In July 1996, the American Embassy in China contacted Sinochem and requested a list of Chinese glycerin makers, but the company refused to reveal the names. It was not until September 1996 that Sinochem provided a name of the manufacturer of the tainted syrup. They identified Tianhong Fine Chemicals Factory as the manufacturer. While the FDA tried to find out Tianhong's address, Chinese officials were reluctant to become involved. One year and a half after the FDA began to trace the poisonous shipments, an inspector, Ted Sze, finally visited the Tianhong Fine Chemicals Factory in Dalian, northeastern China. Once he was inside, there was nothing to do: the plant had already been shut down. The Dutch authorities assessed a $250,000 fine against Vos B.V., for not alerting anyone when they tested the syrup and found impurities.

=== 2006 – China ===
Wang Guiping discovered how easy it was to enter China's pharmaceutical supply business and earn extra money. Records also revealed that to fool buyers, Wang falsified his license and laboratory analysis reports.

Wang declared that after making the first order of counterfeit syrup, he swallowed some of it. Once verifying that he was fine, he shipped it to Qiqihar No. 2 Pharmaceutical in 2005. Some time later, Wang found a reference to diethylene glycol in a chemical book. After manufacturing a second batch of syrup containing diethylene glycol for Qiqihar No. 2 Pharmaceutical, no taste-test was performed. The counterfeit syrup ended in ampules of Amillarisin A, a medication for gall bladder problems; special pediatric enema fluid; blood vessel disease injections; intravenous pain reliever; and an arthritis medication.

In April 2006, the Guangdong Province Hospital of Guangzhou began administering Amillarisin A to their patients. Soon thereafter, patients died after receiving the medication. Wang was caught and Qiqihar No. 2 Pharmaceutical was shut down by the authorities. Besides Wang, five employees were prosecuted.

=== 2006 – Panama ===
Ending September 2006, the Arnulfo Arias Madrid Hospital at Panama City was getting full with patients with contradictory symptoms. The symptoms seemed to match with Guillain–Barré syndrome, but these patients were also losing their ability to urinate, a symptom not related to Guillain–Barré. The death rate of this mysterious illness was nearly 50%, when hospital management decided to isolate all the patients with the illness in a large room and doctors could compare notes and theories. Soon, patients from other parts of the country started to arrive at hospitals. Doctors had no idea what was happening: the mysterious illness was attacking elderly citizens with hypertension and diabetes history. About half were receiving Lisinopril (a blood pressure medicine), and many did not remember clearly if they had been taking other drugs. Suspecting something wrong with Lisinopril, the medicine was removed from the pharmacies while the U.S. Food and Drug Administration conducted lab analyses, revealing the blood pressure drug was safe; CDC epidemiologists were then invited to participate.

When a patient admitted for a heart attack developed the mysterious illness at the hospital, Dr. Nestor Sosa, an infectious disease specialist, analyzed the medical record. Because patients treated with Lisinopril developed a cough (a common side effect of ACE inhibitors), they were prescribed an expectorant. Immediately, biological samples and the syrup were sent by jet to CDC for analysis. When urine analyses for a series of metals, pesticides or their metabolites resulted negative, CDC scientists recalled the Nigeria and Haiti incidents. The CDC employed modern laboratory equipment to analyze the samples and confirm the results: the samples contained approximately 8% v/v DEG. Later, raw glycerin was analyzed and results revealed 22.2% v/v DEG.

The Panamanian Government made a nationwide campaign, collecting around 6,000 bottles of cough syrup and three other products with the tainted glycerin manufactured by Social Security Laboratories. The 46 barrels of syrup were bought by Social Security Laboratories through a Panamanian middleman, Grupo Comercial Medicom, who bought the product from Rasfer Internacional, a Spanish company. In fact, Rasfer received the product from CNSC Fortune Way, which in turn bought it from the Taixing Glycerine Factory. At the request of the United States, the State Food and Drug Administration of China investigated Taixing Glycerine Factory and CNSC Fortune Way, but the agency concluded it is not under their jurisdiction because the factory is not certified to make medicine.

Taixing sold the syrup as "TD glycerin", wording that neither Chinese inspectors nor Spanish medical authorities comprehended. Unfortunately, Taixing used "TD" for the Chinese word tidai, meaning "substitute". A New York Times reporter tried to obtain a comment from CNSC Fortune Way at the CPHI Worldwide (the world's largest annual pharmaceutical convention) held in Milan, Italy, during 2007, but their representatives refused to comment.

In August 2009, the Supreme Court decided to send the diethylene glycol file to the Public Ministry for an extension. The following month, the Toxicology Department of the Institute of Legal Medicine and Forensic Science published a list of 1,155 names whose medicine bottles tested positive for DEG. Only approximately 3,000 bottles had been analyzed from the total 6,000 bottles collected. The fiscal attorney urged affected citizens to approach the Public Ministry to update the official legal file and for further medical analysis. Two months later, findings revealed that 145 were proven to die by DEG intoxication, but the DA still has to investigate 953 lawsuits.

The New York Times reported that Taixing was closed by the Chinese government and CNSC Fortune Way, which is also owned by the Chinese government, was never sanctioned. In Spain, Rasfer International declared bankruptcy after the lawyer of Medicom filed a lawsuit of $400 million in July 2008. Spanish authorities are prosecuting Asunción Criado, general manager of Rasfer Internacional, S.A., and await Panamanian citizens, René Luciani (former Social Security Director) and Jéssica Rodríguez (former Purchase National Director) for their hearings. Meanwhile, in Panama, De la Cruz, legal representative of Medicom, remains in jail pending a trial. Seventeen other persons have also been charged related to this incident. Panama awaits the extradition of Criado for her hearing.

Panama's case made CDC set standardized methodology for DEG identification, hoping to have more timely response in future events. The agency also identified urinary DEG as a biomarker for DEG exposures. The United States Food and Drug Administration also issued an Industry Guidance Document "intended to alert pharmaceutical manufacturers, pharmacy compounders, repackers, and suppliers to the potential public health hazard of glycerin contaminated with diethylene glycol (DEG)" and recommended appropriate testing procedures for the use of glycerin.

During June 2011, the number of confirmed deaths according to the official list rose to 219 victims.

=== 2007 – Worldwide toothpaste incident ===
In May 2007, a Panamanian named Eduardo Arias discovered a 59-cent toothpaste that was labeled containing DEG. Panamanian officials traced the toothpaste to a local company in the Colón Free Trade Zone. In fact, the company bought the product in China and had already re-exported toothpaste to Costa Rica, Dominican Republic and Haiti, making Panama kick off a local warning. For the end of the month, the Chinese government committed to investigate the "supposedly" tainted toothpaste that had been recalled in Panama and Dominican Republic, but stated that, as per an essay written in 2000, a toothpaste containing 15.6% DEG was not dangerous.

On June 1, 2007, the FDA warned consumers to avoid toothpaste from China, although there was no information if these toothpastes had already entered the US, and started testing any imported Chinese toothpaste. Days later, Colgate-Palmolive found counterfeit toothpaste with its name, which was contaminated with DEG and found at dollar-type discount stores in New York, New Jersey, Pennsylvania and Maryland. The toothpaste was labeled as "Manufactured in South Africa" and contained misspellings like "isclinically", "SOUTH AFRLCA" and "South African Dental Assoxiation". Although there were no reports of anyone harmed, several people in the eastern US reported experiencing headaches and pain after using the product. It was later discovered that a great number of tubes with poison ended up in hospitals for the mentally ill, prisons, juvenile detention centers, other hospitals and many other state institutions.

In July 2007, health authorities in the UK detected a counterfeit Sensodyne toothpaste on sale at a car boot sale in Derbyshire. Soon, other countries also recalling Chinese-made toothpaste were Belize, Canada, Mozambique, Saudi Arabia, New Zealand, Spain, Italy, Japan, and Ireland, plus an Indianapolis, Indiana US hotel-supplier that distributed Chinese toothpaste in Barbados, Belgium, Bermuda, Britain, Canada, Dominican Republic, France, Germany, Ireland, Italy, Mexico, Spain, Switzerland, Turks and Caicos, the United Arab Emirates and the United States. What began as a local alert revealed a global problem in more than 30 countries and involving more than thirty brands. The world outcry made Chinese officials ban the practice of using diethylene glycol in toothpaste.

=== 2008 – Nigeria ===
Ending November 2008, infants started to die after developing unexplained fevers and vomiting. Investigations revealed that all had taken the medicine My Pikin Baby, a teething mixture tainted with diethylene glycol. The poison had caused the death of at least 84 Nigerian children between ages of two months and seven years.

The Nigerian government traced the diethylene glycol to an unlicensed chemical dealer in Lagos, who sold it to a local pharmaceutical manufacturer. Barewa Pharmaceuticals was shut down and the product was pulled off the shelves. They also arrested 12 people in connection with the incident. This being the second incident involving counterfeit glycerine, it prompted the Nigerian National Agency for Food And Drug Administration and Control (NAFDAC) to adopt zero tolerance for counterfeits.

=== 2019/2020 – Brazil ===
In December 2019, some people in the city of Belo Horizonte, initially all from the same neighbourhood, started having symptoms such as nausea, vomiting, abdominal pain, acute kidney failure, facial nerve paralysis, blurred vision, temporary blindness and sensory changes. On 9 January 2020, a police report indicated quantities of diethylene glycol in one brand of beer from the small upscale brewery Backer that could have poisoned 18 people in Belo Horizonte and other cities in Minas Gerais state. On 17 January, the police confirmed the fourth death from symptoms matching DEG poisoning, and DEG contamination had been found in eight brands of beer from the same brewery. On 9 June, the police indicted 11 people, including brewery owners and employees, for manslaughter, unintentional bodily harm and food contamination. On 18 July, the 10th victim died in a Belo Horizonte hospital, a 65-year-old man who had been hospitalized since December 2019 due to the poisoning. The investigation revealed that DEG had been used as a coolant for the brewery equipment, in what should have been a closed circuit, but an undetected leak in the system contaminated some batches of beer.

=== 2020 – India ===
In the first week of 2020, around 17 children from Ramnagar, in the union territory of Jammu and Kashmir, were hospitalised, more than half of whom died of kidney failure. The regional drug controller authorities after investigation found out that a faulty batch of the Coldbest PC cough syrup contained 34.97% of diethylene glycol, which resulted in poisoning and subsequent renal failures. The product was recalled and after an investigation, the Drug Controller General of India, VG Somani, said at India Pharma 2020, that the GMP was not followed, and negligence was found during the production process itself. The Himachal Pradesh government is filing a criminal case against the company and its executives.

=== 2022 – India/Gambia/Indonesia/Uzbekistan ===
The WHO issued a medical product alert for four "contaminated" Indian pediatric medicines, manufactured by a firm in Haryana's Sonepat, saying these drugs identified in Gambia had been potentially linked with acute kidney injuries and 70 deaths among children in the west African country. The cough and cold syrups produced by Maiden Pharmaceuticals Limited, Sonepat in India. WHO said laboratory analysis of samples of each of the four products confirmed that they contain unacceptable amounts of diethylene glycol and ethylene glycol as contaminants.

Subsequently, on 21 October 2022, 99 children were reported dead in Indonesia after ingesting the cough syrups. As a result, authorities in Indonesia banned all syrup medicines. However, they advised that the syrups suspected of causing the deaths in Gambia, were not sold locally in Indonesia.

=== 2025 - India ===
In September, at least 19 children under 5 years old in Madhya Pradesh died after taking a cough syrup called Coldrif made by Sresan Pharmaceutical Manufacturer in Tamil Nadu. The contaminated drug contained 48.6% of toxin DEG though the allowed limit in India and by the WHO is 0.1%. India also states that there are two more toxic cough syrups; Respifresh TR (containing 1.342% of toxin DEG) by Rednex Pharmaceuticals and Relife (containing 0.616% of toxin DEG) by Shape Pharma, both based in Gujarat.

== See also ==
- Counterfeit medications
- Ethylene
- Ethylene glycol poisoning
- Polyethylene glycol
- 1985 diethylene glycol wine scandal
