= 1985 Austrian diethylene glycol wine scandal =

Wine fraud

The 1985 Austrian diethylene glycol wine scandal (German: Glykolwein-Skandal) was an incident in which several Austrian wineries were found to be illegally adulterating their wines using the toxic substance diethylene glycol (a minor ingredient in some brands of antifreeze) to make the wines taste sweeter and more full-bodied in the style of late harvest wines. Many of these Austrian wines were exported to West Germany, some of them in bulk to be bottled at large-scale West German bottling facilities. At these facilities, some Austrian wines were illegally blended into German wines by the importers, resulting in diethylene glycol ending up in some bulk-bottled West German wines.

The scandal was uncovered by wine laboratories performing quality controls on wines sold in West Germany and immediately made headlines worldwide. The affected wines were immediately withdrawn from the market. Many involved in the scandal were sentenced to prison or heavy fines in Austria and West Germany.

The short-term effect of the scandal was a complete collapse of Austrian wine exports and a total loss of reputation of the entire Austrian wine industry, with a significant adverse impact on the reputation of German wines. The long-term effect was that the Austrian wine industry focused their production on other wine types than previously, primarily dry white wines instead of sweet wines, and increasingly targeted a higher market segment. Still, it took the Austrian wine industry over a decade to recover. Austria also enacted much stricter wine laws.

== Background ==
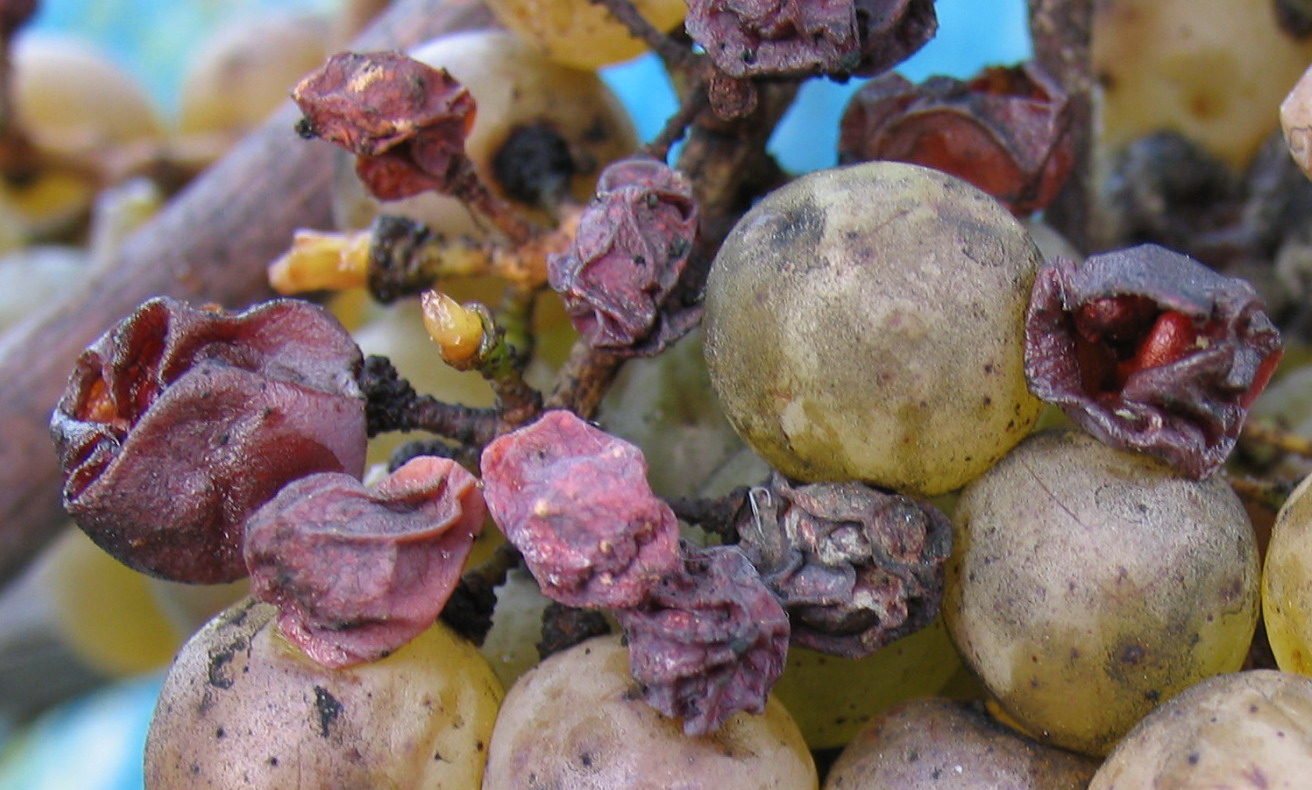
Ripe grapes affected by noble rot, a type of fungal mold which grows on grapes and results in a very sweet and concentrated wine when processed.

At the time of the scandal, West Germany was the most important export market for Austrian wine and had been so for several years, with an increasing trend. The Austrian wines exported to West Germany were of a similar style to those produced by West Germany itself, meaning semi-sweet and sweet white wines. However, many of these Austrian wines were focused on the low-cost segment, priced lower than German wines at the corresponding level of sweetness.

The traditional sweet wines of West Germany and Austria are produced from late harvest grapes, some of them affected by noble rot, and labelled in a hierarchy of Prädikat designations from Kabinett to Trockenbeerenauslese, depending on the ripeness of the grapes. Although sweet reserve (blending a wine with its own must) was allowed for the production of semi-sweet wines, no external sources of sugar were allowed for any wines with a Prädikat designation. Thus, the production of wines at higher Prädikat levels tends to vary from year to year depending on vintage conditions, and all wines with higher designations sell at a premium price. As the sweet wines were more favoured at the time of the scandal than they have been in the 1990s and 2000s, and since the Prädikat designations were almost universally recognized throughout the German-speaking countries, a cheap Auslese or Beerenauslese was often identified as a "bargain" by many German consumers. Many of the affordable sweet wines exported from Austria were blends from different grape varieties, and several of them did not carry any varietal designations, in contrast to the more expensive Prädikat wines of West Germany, which often were produced from Riesling grapes.

Some Austrian exporters had entered into long-term contracts with supermarket chains to supply large quantities of wine at a specified quality level in terms of Prädikat. These producers encountered problems in some weak vintages, where much of the grape harvest did not reach sufficient ripeness levels. At the levels of ripeness that were reached, the wines would be less sweet, less full-bodied, and more acidic. One vintage plagued by these problems in Austria was 1982. It is believed that when this led to insufficient quantities of wine being available to fulfill the contracts, some producers started to search for methods, including illegal ones, to "correct" the wines.

Simple sweetening (also illegal) would not necessarily do the job since it would not sufficiently correct the taste profile of the wine. By using diethylene glycol (DEG), it was possible to affect both the impression of sweetness and the body of the wine. German wine chemists have stated that it is unlikely that an individual winemaker of a small winery had sufficient chemical knowledge to devise the scheme, implying that the recipe must have been drawn up by a knowledgeable wine chemist consulting for a large-scale producer.

== Diethylene glycol ==
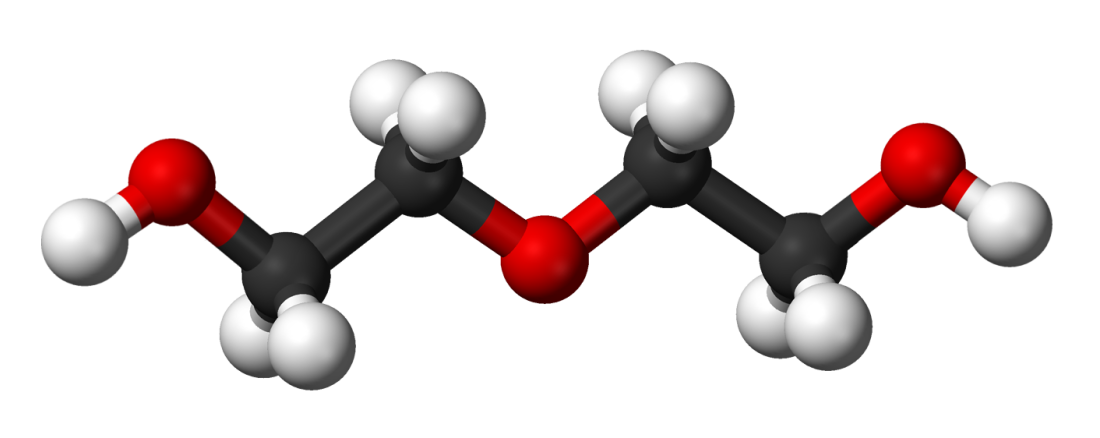
Molecular structure of diethylene glycol.

DEG was otherwise used as an industrial chemical. Adulteration of products with DEG has led to thousands of deaths worldwide since the first recorded case: the Elixir sulfanilamide incident in 1937. DEG was commonly misconceived of as being ethylene glycol, which is what is commonly understood as antifreeze, and is more toxic. Most of the recalled wines contained up to a few grams of DEG per litre (and many only a fraction of a gram), which meant that dozens of bottles would have to be consumed in a limited period to reach the lethal dose of approximately 40 grams. However, in one record-setting wine (a 1981 Welschriesling Beerenauslese from Burgenland), 48 grams per litre was detected, which meant that the consumption of a single bottle could have been lethal. Also, long-term consumption of DEG is known to damage the kidney, liver, and brain.

== Discovery ==
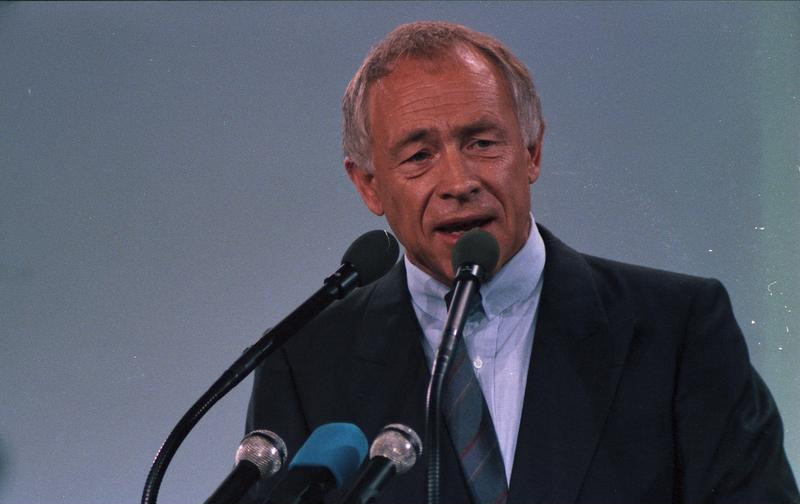
Heiner Geißler was the German minister for health in 1985. His ministry issued health warnings for Austrian wines and a blacklist with all wines found to contain diethylene glycol.

The first wine discovered to contain DEG was a 1983 Ruster Auslese from a supermarket in Stuttgart, analysed on June 27, 1985. Domestic wine fraud involving illegal sweetening had occurred earlier in West Germany and had led to investigations and prosecution of the winemakers involved. What made the 1985 findings very different was that a toxic compound had been used, and subsequent sampling indicated that many different bottlings were part of this dangerous adulteration scheme. Therefore, unlike cases of simple sweetening, the 1985 DEG findings immediately took the proportion of a full-scale scandal requiring action by federal authorities in both West Germany and Austria. On July 9, the Federal Ministry of Health in Bonn issued an official health warning against the consumption of Austrian wines. The findings immediately made headlines in West German media, and from there were cabled out throughout the world.

== Market consequences ==
From mid-July onward, selling Austrian wine on any export market was almost impossible. Some countries like Switzerland and France confiscated thousands of bottles, and Japan introduced a ban on the import and sale of all Austrian wines on July 29, 1985. In many other countries, wine dealers removed Austrian wines from shelves.

From a pre-1985 level of around 45 million liters per year, exports immediately fell to one-tenth or roughly 4.4 million liters in 1986. They stayed at approximately the same level until 1989 and were slightly higher in 1990–97, but still well below pre-1985 levels. Not until 2001 did the export volume, at just over 50 million liters, match the old level. It thus took the Austrian wine industry fifteen years to regain its former position in terms of export volume, despite optimistic predictions from some quarters in Austria that it would all be forgotten in other countries in one year.

== Legal consequences ==
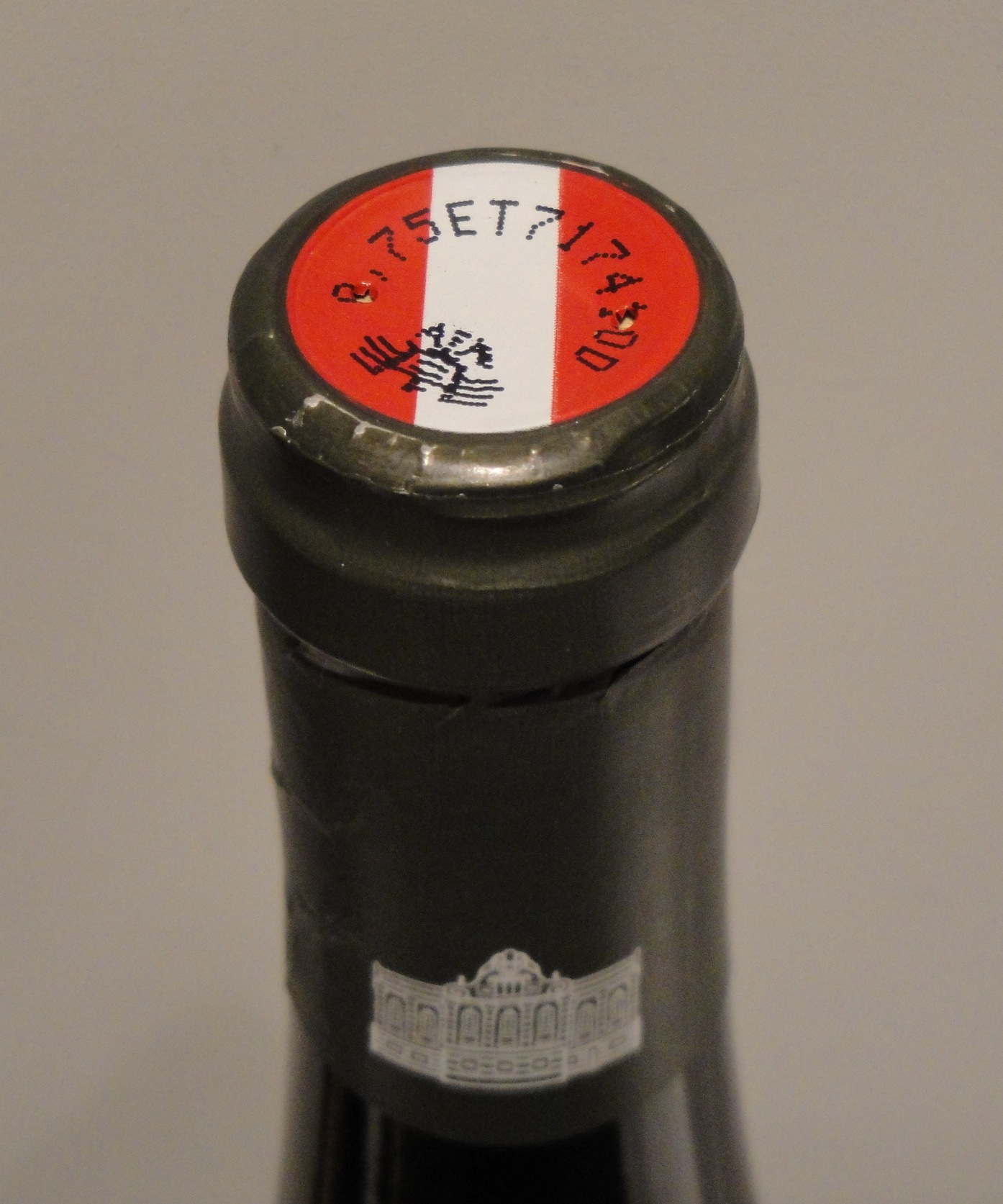
A mandatory numbered seal on all Austrian wine bottles at Qualitätswein level was one of the measures introduced in the 1985 Austrian wine law.

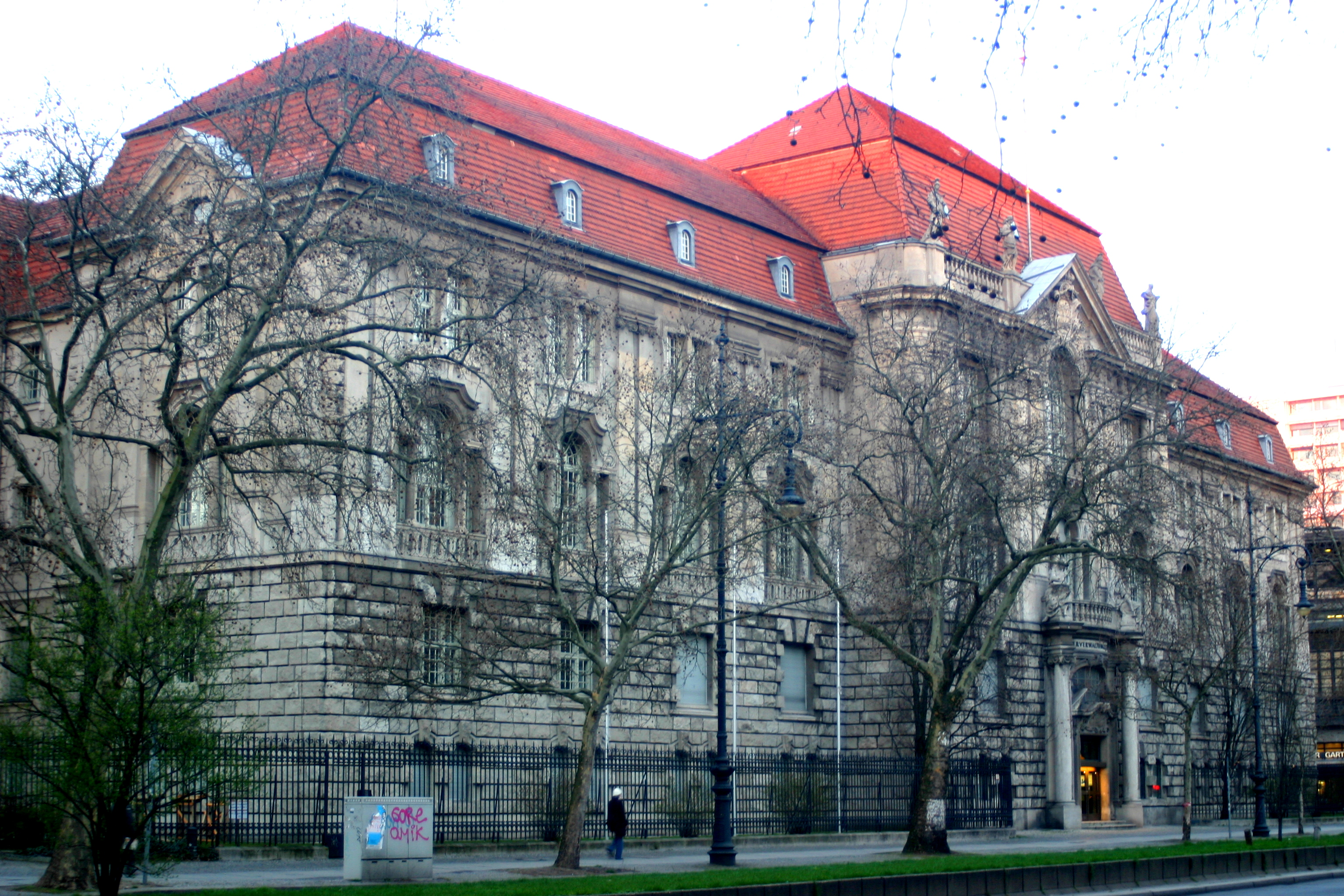
The Federal Administrative Court of Germany, then still located in Berlin, ruled against bottling firm Pieroth and upheld the legality of the list.

In the weeks following the breaking of the scandal, dozens of wine producers and dealers were arrested by Austrian authorities. The industry's practice of DEG adulteration was traced back to Otto Nadrasky, a 58-year-old chemist and wine consultant from Grafenwörth, Lower Austria. The first prison sentence, of one and a half years, followed in mid-October. Many of the adulterated wines were found to originate in Wagram in Lower Austria, where a consulting wine chemist was prosecuted. One of the convicted Wagram winemakers, Karl Grill, proprietor of Firma Gebrüder Grill, committed suicide after being sentenced.

The Parliament of Austria enacted a stricter wine law on August 29, 1985. Having seen the immediate collapse of wine exports, the Austrian government rushed this legislation through parliament for it to be in effect before the 1985 harvest.

In West Germany, following a lengthy investigation, six former leading employees of the wholesale dealer and bottler Pieroth were sentenced to fines of one million Deutsche Marks by the Landgericht in Koblenz in April 1996.

Further legal action took place over the coming years across West Germany. Pieroth fought a legal action in the administrative courts to try to establish that the Federal Minister for Youth, Family and Health, Heiner Geißler (CDU) had exceeded his authority when his ministry had issued a public list containing all wines that had been found to contain DEG, and naming the bottler in each case. The case went through all three tiers of the administrative courts. It was finally settled on October 18, 1990, when the Federal Administrative Court of Germany ruled against Pieroth and found that Geißler had the right to issue the list.

Pieroth's actions, which did not earn the company any sympathy with the public, were probably not meant as a measure to allow the further selling of adulterated wine but as an attempt to put Pieroth in a position to recover money from customers who had refused to pay their outstanding bills following the scandal. Other courts had ruled in civil law proceedings that deliveries of wines found to contain DEG were a form of non-fulfillment of a purchase contract that removed any obligation to pay but that customers still had to pay if they only suspected that a wine contained DEG, and the wine was subsequently cleared of suspicion. Thus, the legal status of the list was a crucial element in the many contract disputes.

== Destruction of the wine ==
As a consequence of the scandal, a total of 27,000,000 litres of wine (corresponding to 36 million bottles or seven months' worth of Austria's total wine exports at the pre-1985 level) had to be destroyed by the West German authorities, which had confiscated or otherwise collected the wine. Doing this in an environmentally acceptable way proved challenging because DEG was incompatible with sewage treatment plants. In the end, the wine was disposed of and destroyed by being poured into the ovens of a cement plant as a cooling agent instead of water. In Austria, it was reported that the wine, mixed with other agents, was used as a road antifreeze in the particularly severe continental winter of February to March 1986.

== In popular culture ==
The wine scandal has been the subject of many satirical references to Austrian wine inside Austria, in Germany, and beyond, and long after 1985. Shortly after the scandal, the Styrian bard Volker Schöbitz composed a polka under the rhyming title Zum Wohl, Glykol – "Cheers, glycol". Glykol was also announced to be the 1985 Word of the Year in West Germany.

In The Simpsons season 1 episode "The Crepes of Wrath", a reference to the scandal is made when two Frenchmen with whom Bart is staying are arrested after putting antifreeze in wine and making Bart drink it.

British rock band Half Man Half Biscuit reference the scandal in the song "RSVP" from their 2011 album 90 Bisodol (Crimond).

== See also ==
- Wine fraud – Fraudulent activity in the commerce of wine
- Elixir sulfanilamide – Another product containing diethylene glycol which similarly led to tighter food and drug laws in the United States
