= List of poisonings =

These are lists of poisonings, deliberate and accidental, in chronological order by the date of death of the victim(s). They include mass poisonings, confirmed attempted poisonings, suicides, fictional poisonings and people who are known or suspected to have killed multiple people.

== Non-fiction ==
=== Fatal ===
- Socrates (d. 399 BC), Greek philosopher; according to Plato, he was sentenced to kill himself by drinking poison hemlock
- Artaxerxes III (d. 338 BC), Persian king; possibly poisoned by his vizier Bagoas
- Artaxerxes IV (d. 336 BC), Persian king; poisoned by his vizier Bagoas
- Bagoas (d. 336 BC), Persian vizier and king-maker; poisoned by Darius III
- Roman matronas poisoned their husbands(d.331 BC). 200 of them executed.
- Demosthenes (d. 322 BC), Athenian politician
- Xu Pingjun (d. 71 BC), first empress of Emperor Xuan of Han.
- Antipater the Idumaean (d. 43 BC), father of Herod the Great
- Drusus Julius Caesar (d. 23), son of Tiberius
- Emperor Zhi of Han (d.146)
- Emperor Hui of Jin China (d. 304)
- Ali ibn Abi Talib (d. 661), fourth caliph of the Rashidun Caliphate and first of the Twelve Imams of Shia Islam
- Hasan ibn Ali(d.670), fifth caliph of the Rashidun Caliphate and the second of the Twelve Imams of Shia Islam. poisoned by his wife, on the orders of Mu'awiya I.
- Umar ibn Abd al-Aziz (d. 720), eighth caliph of the Umayyad Caliphate
- Muhammad al-Baqir (d. 733), fifth Imam of Twelver Shia Islam; supposedly died after being given a poisoned saddle
- Mūsá al-Kāẓim (d. 799), seventh Imam of Twelver Shia Islam
- Beorhtric of Wessex (d. 802), unintentionally poisoned by his wife, Eadburh
- Muhammad al-Jawad (d. 835), ninth Imam of Twelver Shia Islam; supposedly poisoned by his wife on orders from the new caliph
- Romanus II (d. 963), Byzantine emperor of the Macedonian dynasty
- Alan III, Duke of Brittany (d. 1040)
- Constantine II of Armenia (d. 1129)
- Alphonse I, Count of Toulouse (d. 1148)
- Baldwin III of Jerusalem (d. 1162)
- Blanche of Bourbon (d. 1361), first wife of King Pedro of Castile
- Louis, Count of Gravina (d. 1362)
- Robert, Count of Eu (d. 1387)
- Ladislaus, King of Naples (d. 1414)
- Dmitry Shemyaka (d. 1453), Grand Duke of Moscow; poisoned with arsenic by Vasily Tyomniy's agents in Great Novgorod
- Giovanni Pico della Mirandola (d. 1494)
- Margaret Drummond (d. 1502), mistress of King James IV of Scotland
- Timoji (d. 1512), Hindu privateer and Portuguese ally
- Juan Ponce de León (d. 1521), Spanish conquistador; died after being wounded by a poisoned arrow
- Mikhail Skopin-Shuisky (d. 1610), Russian general and statesman
- Pocahontas (d.1617) while it is not known what she died from, poisoning is one theory.
- Yamada Nagamasa (d. 1630), Japanese adventurer
- Marcy Clay (d. 1665), English thief and highwayrobber
- Charles VI, Holy Roman Emperor (d. 1740), ate poisonous mushrooms
- Johann Schobert (d. 1767), German composer; ate poisonous mushrooms believing them to be edible
- Swill milk scandal over 8,000 infants died in the 1850s after drinking milk containing swill
- Esing Bakery incident (1857) 700 people were poisoned after eating bread containing Arsenic. None died immediately but three from long-term effects
- 1900 English beer poisoning in 1900 over 6,000 people were poisoned by tainted beer containing contaminated sulphuric acid and arsenic causing at least 70 to die
- Bradford sweets poisoning (1858); 21 people died and more than 200 others became ill when confections accidentally made with arsenic trioxide were sold from a market stall in Bradford, England
- Charles Francis Hall (d. 1871), American Arctic explorer poisoned with arsenic by members of the Polaris expedition.
- Nine children killed on 28 May 1879 in Newark, Vermont after drinking from a polluted stream.
- Guangxu Emperor (d. 1908), Emperor of the Qing dynasty; poisoned with arsenic by unidentified persons
- Olive Thomas (d. 1920), American silent film actress; accidentally ingested a large dose of mercury(II) chloride
- Between six and eight killed and 400 became ill after eating spoiled ice cream in Meppel, Netherlands in July 1921.
- 9 men died at the Elks National Home in November 1923 after drinking apple cider containing Pesticide
- Marija Hladnik Berden (d. 1924), Slovenian teacher, organist and composer; poisoned with phosphorus supposedly by her maidservant
- Madge Oberholtzer (d. 1925), rape victim of Ku Klux Klan leader D.C. Stephenson; died after attempting to commit suicide with mercury(II) chloride
- George V (d. 1936), King of the United Kingdom and the British Dominions, and Emperor of India; injected with morphine and cocaine by royal physician Bertrand Dawson in a rogue mercy killing
- Nestor Lakoba (d. 1936), Abkhaz Communist leader; poisoned by NKVD chief Lavrenti Beria
- Elixir sulfanilamide caused mass poisoning in the United States in 1937 causing 105 adults' and children's deaths
- Abram Slutsky (d.1938), head of Soviet spy service; poisoned with hydrogen cyanide by NKVD
- Nikolai Koltsov (d. 1940), Russian biologist; poisoned by NKVD secret police
- Erwin Rommel (d. 1944), German general; opted to commit suicide with cyanide after facing trial for his involvement in the 20 July plot
- Eva Hitler (née Braun) (d. 1945), wife of Adolf Hitler; committed suicide by cyanide capsule at Hitler's side
- The six Goebbels children (d. 1945); poisoned by their parents Magda and Joseph Goebbels, who then killed themselves by poison and gunshots shortly afterwards
- Heinrich Himmler (d. 1945), leader of the Nazi Schutzstaffel (SS); suicide by cyanide capsule after being captured
- Odilo Globocnik (d. 1945)
- Hermann Göring (d. 1946), leader of the Nazi Luftwaffe; suicide by cyanide capsule, long after being captured and only hours before his sentenced hanging was to take place
- Theodore Romzha (d. 1947), bishop of the Ruthenian Greek Catholic Church; poisoned by NKVD agents, who injected him with curare on orders from Nikita Khrushchev
- Alan Turing (d. 1954), British mathematician; apparently committed suicide by injecting an apple with cyanide and taking a bite, though it has also been speculated that the poisoning was accidental
- Muhammad Zarqtuni (d. 1954), Moroccan nationalist; swallowed a cyanide tablet while in prison
- Stepan Bandera (d. 1959); poisoned by a cyanide capsule shot from a gun by KGB agents
- 1971 Iraq poison grain disaster; at least 650 people died after eating methylmercury-treated grain intended for seeding
- Bandō Mitsugorō VIII (d. 1975), Japanese kabuki actor; ate four livers of fugu fish
- Nine killed in Denver City, Texas due to an accidental release of hydrogen sulfide.
- Jayanta Hazarika (d. 1977), Assamese singer and musician
- Georgi Markov (d. 1978), Bulgarian dissident; assassinated in London with ricin
- Peoples Temple members (1978); over 900 died by cyanide-laced punch at Jonestown
- Love Canal (up to 1978); buried toxic waste was covered and used as a building site for housing and a school in Niagara Falls, New York, resulting in claims of chronic poisoning that led to a massive environmental cleanup
- Sverdlovsk anthrax leak at least 68 people died on April 2nd 1979 after anthrax was accidentally released from a Soviet military research base
- Chicago Tylenol murders (1982) Several people aged 12 - 35 died from a potassium cyanide poisoning after consuming contaminated Tylenol capsules containing paracetamol Capsule (pharmacy) Paracetamol
- Bhopal disaster (1984); accidental release of poisonous gas from a pesticide plant in India that killed over 10,000 people and injured many more
- Vypin alcohol poisonings (1982) 77 people died after drinking liquor containing Methanol
- Paraquat murders (1985) 35 people were poisoned including 12 fatally after drinking beverages contaminated with Paraquat and Diquat from tampered vending machines in central and western Japan from April until November of 1985
- Sinasa massacre Mangayanon Butaog, a religious leader who poisoned 69 members causing 64 to die while the other 5 spit out the poisoned gruel Butaog gave them.
- Matsumoto incident (1994); Sarin gas attack carried out by members of the Aum Shinrikyo group killed 8 people and injured at least 500 others
- Sarin gas attack on the Tokyo subway (1995); attack carried out by members of the Aum Shinrikyo group killed 14 and injured 1,050
- Marshall Applewhite (d. 1997)
- 1998 Delhi oil poisoning 60 people died in 1998 in Delhi after consuming adulterated mustard oil
- Hamaichi Junior High School Daifuku Mochi Incident 浜一中大福餅事件 or in English Hamaichi Junior High School Daifuku Mochi Incident occurred when over 2,000 people became ill and 44 died after contracting food poisoning
- Moscow theater hostage crisis (2002); to end the crisis, the Federal Security Service (FSB) pumped an undisclosed chemical agent into the building's ventilation system, killing 40 militants and 132 hostages
- Ibn al-Khattab (d. 2002), Sunni jihadi fighter; died from a poisoned letter sent by Russian FSB agency
- Koodathayi Cyanide Murders (d. 2002–2016); 6 people were allegedly killed by Jolly Joseph using potassium cyanide
- Roman Tsepov (d. 2004), Russian businessman; poisoned by unspecified radioactive material
- 2006 Ivory Coast toxic waste dump killed seventeen
- Alexander Litvinenko (d. 2006), Russian ex-spy and investigator; died three weeks after being poisoned by radioactive polonium-210
- Zamfara State lead poisoning epidemic (2010); at least 163 people died in Zamfara State, Nigeria
- 2011 West Bengal alcohol poisonings 167 people died in West Bengal in December of 2011 after drinking spurious liquor mixed with Methanol
- Murder of Garnett Spears (2014), a boy in New York whose mother suffered from Munchausen syndrome by proxy, eventually leading her to give her son a fatal amount of table salt
- 2016 Punjab sweet poisoning (2016) 33 people died after consuming contaminated laddu containing pesticides
- Slobodan Praljak (d. 2017), former Bosnian Croat retired general in the Croatian Army and the Croatian Defence Council; upon hearing of the guilty verdict upheld in his trial for war crimes, he drank poison in the courtroom and died a few hours later
- Assassination of Kim Jong-nam (d. 2017), using a nerve agent at Kuala Lumpur International Airport
- 2017 Malawat poisoning (d. 2017) Aasia Bibi, her alleged boyfriend Muhammad Shahid and her aunt poisoned her husband's milk with rat poison. The milk was later used to make lassi which was later used in a family gathering. 17 people were fatally poisoned
- Dawn Sturgess (d. 2018), accidentally poisoned with the same Novichok nerve agent used in the poisoning of Sergei and Yulia Skripal
- Shady Habash (d. 2020), Egyptian filmmaker; his cause of death was officially ruled as alcohol poisoning, with the prosecutor-general further elaborating that Habash had mistakenly drunk alcohol-based hand sanitizer
- Tribistovo poisoning (2021); carbon monoxide leak from a power generator killed eight teenagers in the New Year's Eve night

=== Non-fatal ===
- Clare Boothe Luce, fell ill from arsenic poisoning in 1956 but did not die
- Nikolay Khokhlov, poisoned by radioactive thallium in Germany in 1957 for refusing to work as a KGB assassin
- Alexander Dubček, Slovak politician; survived an attempt to poison him with strontium-90 in 1968
- Hafizullah Amin, second President of Afghanistan; survived a poisoning by a Soviet agent in 1979
- Zhu Ling, Chinese university student poisoned with thallium in 1995
- Khaled Mashal, leader of Palestinian fundamentalist organization Hamas; survived being poisoned by Israeli assassins in 1997 after two of the assassins were captured and an antidote was supplied by Israel in exchange for their release
- Anna Politkovskaya, Russian journalist; poisoned during a flight to Beslan in 2004
- Viktor Yushchenko, Ukrainian politician; poisoned with dioxin during the 2004 Ukrainian electoral campaign
- Viktor Kalashnikov, Russian ex-KGB colonel; both he and his wife survived being poisoned with mercury in 2010
- Vladimir Kara-Murza, Russian opposition politician; poisoned in 2017 (also possibly in 2015) with an unknown toxin
- Sergei and Yulia Skripal, Russian former double-agent and his daughter; poisoned in 2018 in Salisbury, England with Novichok nerve agent
- Alexei Navalny, Russian opposition leader, poisoned in 2020 with Novichok, during a flight from Tomsk to Moscow
- Unnamed Taylor Child deliberate destruction of a child's liver caused by her mother, Shauna Taylor, in an act of Munchausen by proxy and intentional iron poisoning.
- Camelford water pollution incident in July 1988 Camelford water was contaminated with aluminium sulfate. No one died

=== Alleged ===
- Alexander the Great (d. 323 BC)
- Mithridates VI of Pontus (d. 63 BC), king of Pontus and Armenia Minor
- Ptolemy XIV of Egypt (d. 44 BC); if so, by his sister Cleopatra
- Augustus (d. 14), Roman Emperor, with poisoned figs by his wife Livia
- Germanicus (d. 19), Roman general
- Claudius (d. 54), Roman Emperor, by his wife Agrippina the Younger
- Boudica (d. 60 or 61), Queen of the Iceni tribe and leader of the rebellion against Roman rule in Britain; committed suicide by poison according to Tacitus, though Dio Cassius claimed natural illness
- Constance of Normandy (d. 1090), daughter of King William I of England
- King John of England (d. 1216); with peaches
- Pope Benedict XI (d. 1304)
- Stefan Dusan (d. 1355), Serbian king
- Anne Neville (d. 1485), Queen Consort of England, died of tuberculosis but said to have been poisoned by her husband Richard III
- Matthias Corvinus (d. 1490), King of Hungary
- Catherine of Aragon (d. 1536), Queen Consort of England, thought to have been poisoned by her former husband Henry VIII of England or his wife Anne Boleyn
- King Eric XIV of Sweden (d. 1577); according to folklore, he was killed from poisoning by arsenic hidden in pea soup
- Tycho Brahe (d. 1601), Danish astronomer
- Jamestown colonists (1607–1610); standard historical accounts suggest many early colonists died of starvation, but the possibility of arsenic poisoning by rat poison (or of death by bubonic plague) has also been reported
- Robert Cecil, 1st Earl of Salisbury (d. 1612)
- Victor Amadeus I, Duke of Savoy (d. 1637)
- Wolfgang Amadeus Mozart (d. 1791), Austrian composer; with antimony
- Napoleon Bonaparte (d. 1821); some claim he was killed with arsenic by someone on his staff, though the evidence is inconclusive
- Pope Pius VIII (d. 1830)
- Zachary Taylor (d. 1850), 12th President of the United States; theorized by author Clara Rising that his milk was poisoned during an Independence Day celebration
- John Gallagher Montgomery (d. 1857), U.S. Congressman from Pennsylvania
- Charles Darwin (d. 1882), English naturalist; possibly died due to self-medication with Fowler's solution, one-percent potassium arsenite
- Hanoi Poison Plot (1908), a group of local Vietnamese tried to poison the entire French colonial army's garrison in the Citadel of Hanoi
- Huo Yuanjia (d. 1910), wushu master and Chinese national hero; arsenic
- Emperor Gojong of Korea (d. 1919); allegedly poisoned by the Japanese
- Maxim Gorky (d. 1936), Russian writer; NKVD chief Genrikh Yagoda admitted at the Trial of the Twenty One that he ordered to poison Gorky and his son
- Robert Johnson (d. 1938), American musician
- Raoul Wallenberg (d. c. 1947), Swedish humanitarian who saved tens of thousands of Jews during World War II; reportedly poisoned in Lubyanka prison by Grigory Mairanovsky
- Joseph Stalin (d. 1953); officially cerebral hemorrhage, but according to Vyacheslav Molotov's memoirs and historians Radzinsky and Antonov-Ovseenko, Stalin was poisoned on Lavrenty Beria's orders
- Vasili Blokhin (d. 1955), former executioner of NKVD
- Lal Bahadur Shastri (d. 1966), second Prime Minister of India
- João Goulart (d. 1976), former Brazilian president ousted by 1964 coup d'état
- Carlos Lacerda (d. 1977), Brazilian journalist and presidential nominee
- Pope John Paul I (d. 1978)
- Gulf War syndrome, a chronic multi-symptom disorder afflicting more than 250,000 returning veterans and civilian workers of the Gulf War of 1990–1991; while the etiology of the condition continues to be debated, various manmade poisons have been suggested as possible causes
- Yuri Shchekochikhin (d. 2003), Russian investigative journalist; died presumably from poisoning by radioactive thallium
- Yasser Arafat (d. 2004); reputedly died from liver cirrhosis, which may be a consequence of chronic alcohol use or poisoning. Some Arafat supporters feel it is unlikely that Arafat habitually used alcohol (forbidden by Islam), and so suspect poisoning. However, it is also important to note that cirrhosis is not necessarily caused by alcohol use, or indeed any poison at all.
- Ardeshir Hosseinpour (d. 2007), Iranian nuclear scientist; possibly assassinated by Mossad with "radioactive poisoning" or "gas poisoning"

== Poisoners ==
- Locusta, professional poisoner hired by Roman emperor Nero and his mother Agrippina the Younger for several murders
- Lucrezia Borgia (d. 1519), alleged by rivals of the Borgia family to be a poisoner, using a hollow ring to poison drinks with white arsenic
- Charlotte Bryant (b.1903), was hanged for the arsenic poisoning murder of her husband
- Edward Squire (d. 1598), English scrivener and sailor executed for conspiring to poison Queen Elizabeth I and Robert Devereux, 2nd Earl of Essex
- George Chapman, hanged after murdering three common-law wives
- Mary Ann Cotton, 19th-century woman who poisoned family members for financial gain
- Maria Swanenburg, Dutch serial killer who murdered at least 27 and was suspected of killing more than 90 people
- Thomas Neill Cream (d. 1892), British serial killer
- Vera Renczi, Romanian serial killer who used arsenic to kill two husbands, a son, and 32 suitors
- Nannie Doss, an American serial killer known as the "Black Widow" responsible for the deaths of 11 people
- Anna Marie Hahn (d. 1938), American serial killer
- Dr. John Bodkin Adams, British doctor acquitted in 1957 but suspected of killing 163 patients via morphia and barbiturates.
- Anjette Lyles, American restaurateur responsible for the poisoning deaths of four relatives between 1952–1958 in Macon, Georgia, apprehended on 6 May 1958, and sentenced to death, yet later was involuntary commitmented due to her diagnosis of paranoid schizophrenic, died aged 52 on 4 December 1977 at the Central State Hospital, Milledgeville in Georgia.
- Genene Jones, homicidal nurse
- Grigory Mairanovsky, received Soviet PhD degree for testing poisons on political prisoners
- Stella Nickell, used cyanide-laced Excedrin to kill her husband and another woman in suburban Seattle in 1986
- Charles Sobhraj, serial killer who preyed on Western tourists throughout Southeast Asia during the 1970s
- Jim Jones, cult leader responsible for the mass murder–suicide of 918 of his followers in 1978, using cyanide-laced Flavor-Aid at Jonestown, Guyana
- Michael Swango, American physician and surgeon who fatally poisoned at least thirty of his patients and colleagues
- Graham Frederick Young (d. 1990), British serial killer
- Members of the Aum Shinrikyo religious group in Japan in the 1990s often used poisons for murder, including chemical weapons such as VX and Sarin
- Daisuke Mori, Japanese nurse convicted of one murder and four attempted murders by muscle relaxant
- Harold Shipman (d. 2004), English general practitioner and one of the most prolific known serial killers in modern history
- Richard Kuklinski (d. 2006), American contract killer who was associated with the Gambino crime family
- Andrey Lugovoy (b. 1966), Russian deputy of the State Duma found by European Court of Human Rights beyond reasonable doubt to have killed Alexander Litvinenko
- Dmitry Kovtun (b. 1965), Russian KGB agent who with Andrey Lugovoy killed Alexander Litvinenko
- Anatoly Chepiga (b. 1979), Russian GRU officer identified by journalists as one of the attackers of Sergei and Yulia Skripal
- Alexander Mishkin (b.1979), Russian GRU officer identified by journalists as one of the attackers of Sergei and Yulia Skripal
- Sinasa massacre Mangayanon Butaog, a religious leader who poisoned 69 members causing 64 to die
- Graham Young (b. 1947) English serial killer who murdered his victims by poisoning them. He killed 3 people from 1961-1971
- 2016 Punjab sweet poisoning Khalid Mahmood, a sweet shop owner admitted to being the perpetrator behind the 2016 Punjab sweet poisoning that killed at least 33 people including 5 children
- María Jesús Riffo Sandoval: Chilean cook poisoned milk and cereal intended for students at a school in Angol with arsenic to try and blame it on a different worker, as they were both in love with the same man. Three children died, while another 40 were non-fatally injured (5 severely). She was sentenced to 20 years' imprisonment, and was eventually released after 17 years.
- Lidia Viktorovna Shiryaeva - Lidia Viktorovna Shiryaeva, a grandma admitted to fatally poisoning her 3 grandchildren and her disabled daughter with poisoned noodles
- Erin Patterson (b. 1974), Australian woman who fed beef wellingtons containing death cap mushrooms to four of her relatives, killing three of them and seriously injuring the fourth.

== Fiction ==
As poisoning is a long-established plot device in crime fiction, this is not intended to be an exhaustive list.

=== Novels ===
==== Crime ====
- Anthony Berkeley: The Poisoned Chocolates Case
- Ann Granger: Say It With Poison
- Francis Iles: Before the Fact (filmed as Suspicion), Malice Aforethought
- Agatha Christie: Three Act Tragedy, Sad Cypress, A Pocket Full of Rye, Crooked House, And Then There Were None, Five Little Pigs, Death in the Clouds, The Moving Finger, The Body in the Library, A Caribbean Mystery, The Mirror Crack'd from Side to Side
- John Dickson Carr: The Burning Court, The Black Spectacles (US title: The Problem of the Green Capsule)
- Raymond Postgate: Verdict of Twelve
- Freeman Wills Crofts: The 12.30 from Croydon
- Sir Arthur Conan Doyle: A Study in Scarlet, The Adventure of the Devil's Foot
- Dashiell Hammett: Fly Paper
- Dorothy Sayers: The Unpleasantness at the Bellona Club, Strong Poison
- Gosho Aoyama: Case Closed/Detective Conan
- Rex Stout: Fer-de-Lance, The Red Box, Black Orchids
- Cornell Woolrich: Waltz into Darkness (filmed as Mississippi Mermaid and Original Sin)
- Isaac Asimov: The Death Dealers, The Naked Sun, David Starr, Space Ranger

==== Other ====
- V. C. Andrews: Flowers in the Attic
- Alexandre Dumas, père: The Count of Monte Cristo and The Three Musketeers
- Gustave Flaubert: Madame Bovary
- Kaori Yuki: Count Cain (GodChild after vol. 5) Protagonist Cain Hargreaves is known as the Count/Earl of Poisons. He has quite a collection of poisons, and frequently solves murder cases, almost all of which involve poisons.
- Snow White ate a poisoned apple
- Mingo Swieter in Ricarda Huch's 1917 novel, The Deruga Case (curare)
- Baron Vladimir Harkonnen in Dune by Frank Herbert
- Unsuccessful poisoning of Ron Weasley in Harry Potter and the Half-Blood Prince. The intended victim was Albus Dumbledore.
- David Eddings sagas: In the Belgariad, the Nyissan people poison each other on a regular basis; some work as professional poisoners.
- Isaac Asimov: "Obituary", "Sucker Bait", "The Winnowing"
- Jean de Brunhoff: In The Story of Babar, Babar's predecessor as King of the Elephants eats a poisoned mushroom.

=== Films ===
- Poisoning Paradise (2017)
- Arsenic and Old Lace (1944)
- D.O.A. (1950)
- The Young Poisoner's Handbook (1995)
- Crank (2006)
- Spree (2020)
- Jill Tracy's The Fine Art of Poisoning

=== Television ===
- Third and Tenth Doctors in Doctor Who regenerated due to radiation poisoning. The Fifth Doctor regenerated due to poisoning from the substance Spectrox, giving the antidote to his also poisoned companion Peri Brown.
- Rex Van de Kamp in Desperate Housewives
- King Joffrey, Olenna Tyrell, Gregor Clegane, and Jon Arryn in Game of Thrones
- Peter III of Russia in The Great

=== Plays ===
- Joseph Kesselring: Arsenic and Old Lace
- William Shakespeare:
  - Romeo commits suicide by poison in Romeo and Juliet
  - Hamlet, King Claudius, Gertrude and Laertes in Hamlet, Prince of Denmark
  - Imogen in Cymbeline

== See also ==
- List of people by cause of death
- List of unusual deaths
- Mass suicide
- Lethal injection
- Food poisoning
- Food taster
- LD_{50}
- Arsenic poisoning
- Cyanide poisoning
- Lead poisoning
- Mercury poisoning
- Pesticide poisoning
- Poisonous animals
- Poisonous plants
- Thallium poisoning
- Venom
