= Aasia Bibi =

Aasia Bibi may refer to:

- Aasia Bibi, Pakistani Christian woman accused of blasphemy
- Aasia Bibi, Pakistani woman who poisoned her husband's family to escape a forced marriage; see 2017 Malawat poisoning
