= Edith Murray =

- Died: 1969
- Other name: The Cleveland Black Widow
- Years active: 1903–1921 (suspected)

Details
- Victims: 0–5
- Country: United States
- States: Pennsylvania (suspected); Ohio (suspected)

Edith Murray (? – 1969) was an American woman suspected of fatally poisoning three of her husbands and two of her children for insurance money. She was later arrested in connection to deaths in April 1922, but released due to a lack of evidence. She then died in 1969.

== Suspicious deaths ==
In 1903, Edith Murray lived in Pittsburgh, Pennsylvania with her first husband and two daughters. During the same year, her two daughters died after consuming poisonous tablets left unguarded in the house. No one was arrested for the deaths, as they were assumed to be accidental. Shortly after the incident, Murray divorced her husband.

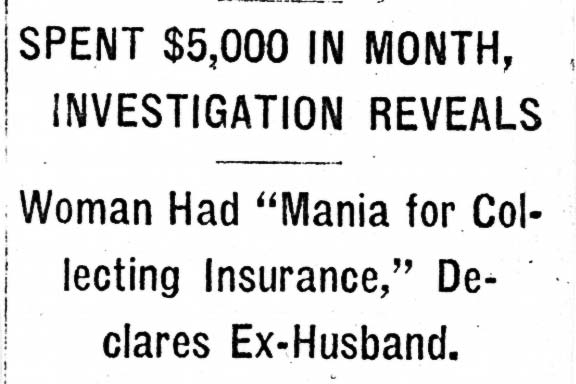
Newspaper clipping about Edith Murray

Murray married her second husband, a Pittsburgh Pharmacist. The couple had two daughters together, born in 1907 and 1908. Their marriage ended during World War 1 after they divorced. Although Murray's second husband was never poisoned, he stated that Murray had an odd obsession with collecting insurance.

Murray married her third husband in Pittsburgh and later moved with him and her daughters to Cleveland, Ohio. In Cleveland, her husband got a high-paying job, which included a $1,200 insurance policy as a perk. A week after the policy went into effect, her husband passed out at work and died. Before his death, he was described as being in good health.

After the death of her third husband, Murray met a wealthy man and married him in less than a year. Shortly after their wedding, the man's health began to decrease rapidly, and he died in May 1919. Edith Murray collected $5,000 in life insurance from his death.

Seven months later, Edith Murray met John Joseph Murray, a former soldier who returned after the Armistice. After Murray married him, She allegedly told her friend, Jessie Burns, that she "would like to get rid of him," and "give him arsenic." Murray also insisted on cooking all of her husband's meals, telling him "I'm not going to cook for you and have you leave everything!" Additionally, Murray unsuccessfully tried to convince John Murray to join a lodge that offered insurance benefits. Weeks before her husband's death, Murray attempted to raise his veteran's insurance from $5,000 to $10,000.

A few weeks later, John Murray died. He was seemingly healthy just a few days before his death. Days later, Edith Murray moved into an expensive apartment and bought a new car. She also met another man, L.P Farrell, to whom she got engaged. The two of them planned a wedding on April 24, 1922.

== Investigation ==
After the death of her fourth husband, local police became suspicious of Murray, so an autopsy was performed on her late husband. Trace amounts of arsenic, a poison, were found in the man's stomach. However, the man's physician claimed he prescribed medicine to the man containing arsenic, so Murray was not arrested.

In April 1922, Murray was arrested for larceny charges. Police announced the following month that they were investigating Murray in connection to the deaths of her family members. Murray's late husband was examined by George Voerg, the city chemist, to see if there were any signs that he was poisoned. Voerg initially couldn't find anything, but after examining the body further, he found traces of arsenic in the man's organs. However, the amount of arsenic found was insignificant. Sometime after May 10, 1922, Edith Murray was released from jail.

== Death ==
After being released from jail, Edith Murray moved back to Pennsylvania. She maintained her innocence until she died in 1969.
