= Herman Billik =

Czech-born American fortune teller and convicted murderer

- Born: Herman Zajíček; 7 April 1868; Bohemia, Austria-Hungary
- Died: 24 May 1917 (aged 49)
- Occupations: Fortune teller, hypnotist
- Status: Deceased
- Conviction: Murder
- Penalty: Death (commuted to life imprisonment)

Herman Billik (born Herman Zajíček; 7 April 1868 – 24 May 1917) was a Czech-born American fortune teller, hypnotist and convicted murderer. He was associated with a series of poisonings in Chicago in the early 20th century. He was convicted in connection with the deaths of members of the Vrzal family.
