= Central State Hospital (Milledgeville, Georgia) =

- U.S. National Register of Historic Places
- U.S. Historic district
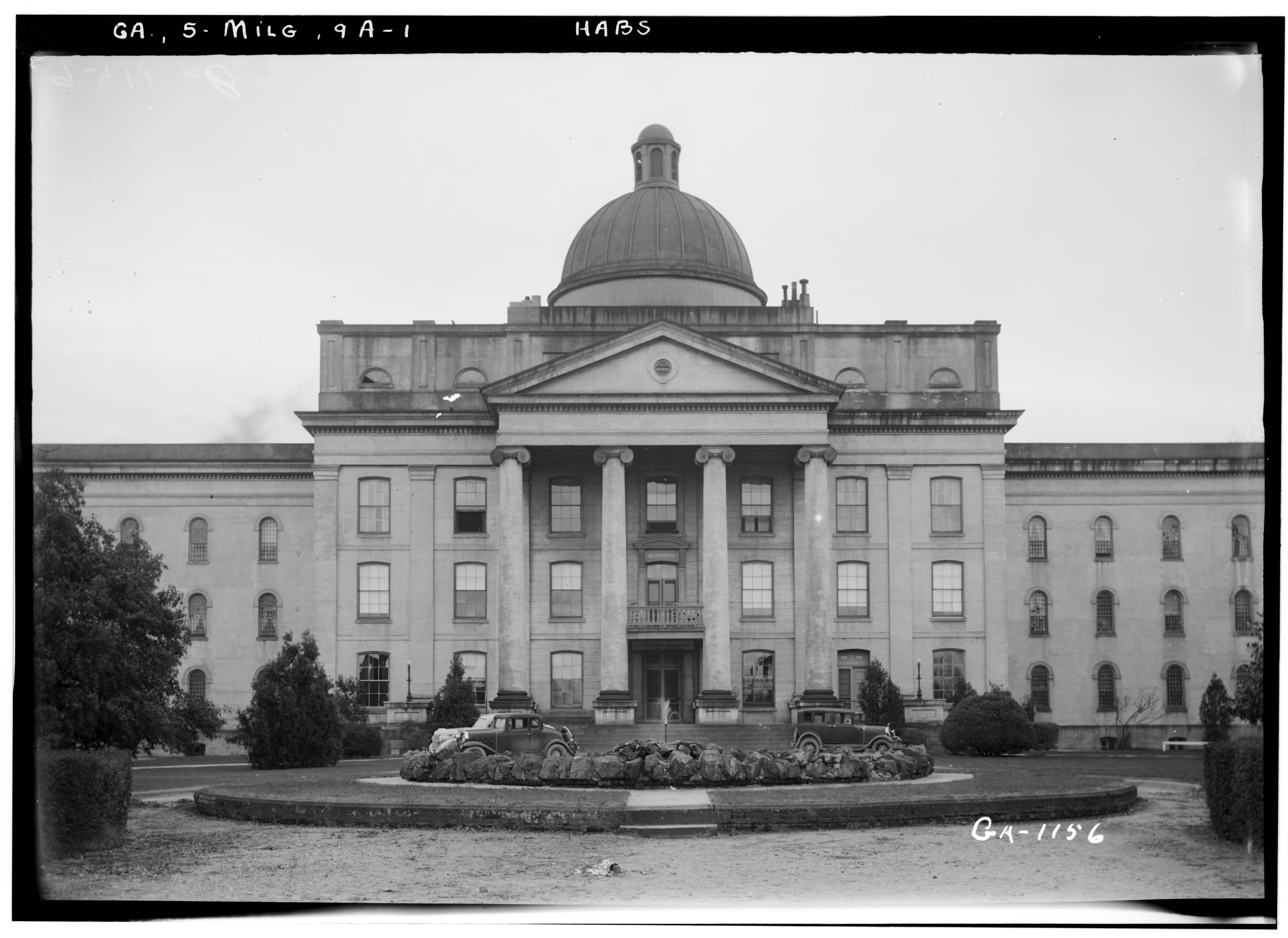
- Central State Hospital, Powell Building, circa 1937

- Location within Georgia
- Nearest city: Milledgeville, Georgia
- Coordinates: 33.051°N 83.222°W
- Area: 20.7 acres (8.4 ha)
- Built: 1842
- NRHP reference No.: 05000694
- Added to NRHP: July 12, 2005

Georgia's state mental asylum located in Milledgeville, Georgia, now known as the Central State Hospital (CSH), has been the state's largest facility for treatment of mental illness and developmental disabilities. In continuous operation since accepting its first patient in December 1842, the hospital was founded as the Georgia State Lunatic, Idiot, and Epileptic Asylum, and was also known as the Georgia State Sanitarium and Milledgeville State Hospital during its long history. By the 1960s the facility had grown into the largest mental hospital in the world (contending with Pilgrim Psychiatric Center in New York). Its landmark Powell Building and the vast, abandoned 1929 Jones Building stand among some 200 buildings on two thousand acres that once housed nearly 12,000 patients.

The CSH complex currently encompasses about 1,750 acres (710 ha), a pecan grove and historic cemeteries, and serves about 200 mental health patients. As of 2016 the facility offers short-stay acute treatment for people with mental illness, residential units and habilitation programs for people with developmental disabilities, recovery programs that require a longer stay, and specialized skilled and ICF nursing centers. Some programs serve primarily the central-Georgia region while other programs serve counties throughout the state.

== History ==
The early decades of the 19th century sparked a wave of nationwide social reforms focused on establishing public education, reforming prisons, and constructing dedicated psychiatric facilities. Responding to an urgent directive from Governor Wilson Lumpkin, the Georgia State Legislature passed a bill in 1837 authorizing the creation of the "State Lunatic, Idiot, and Epileptic Asylum." Established in Milledgeville, which was then the state capital, the facility opened its doors in 1842.

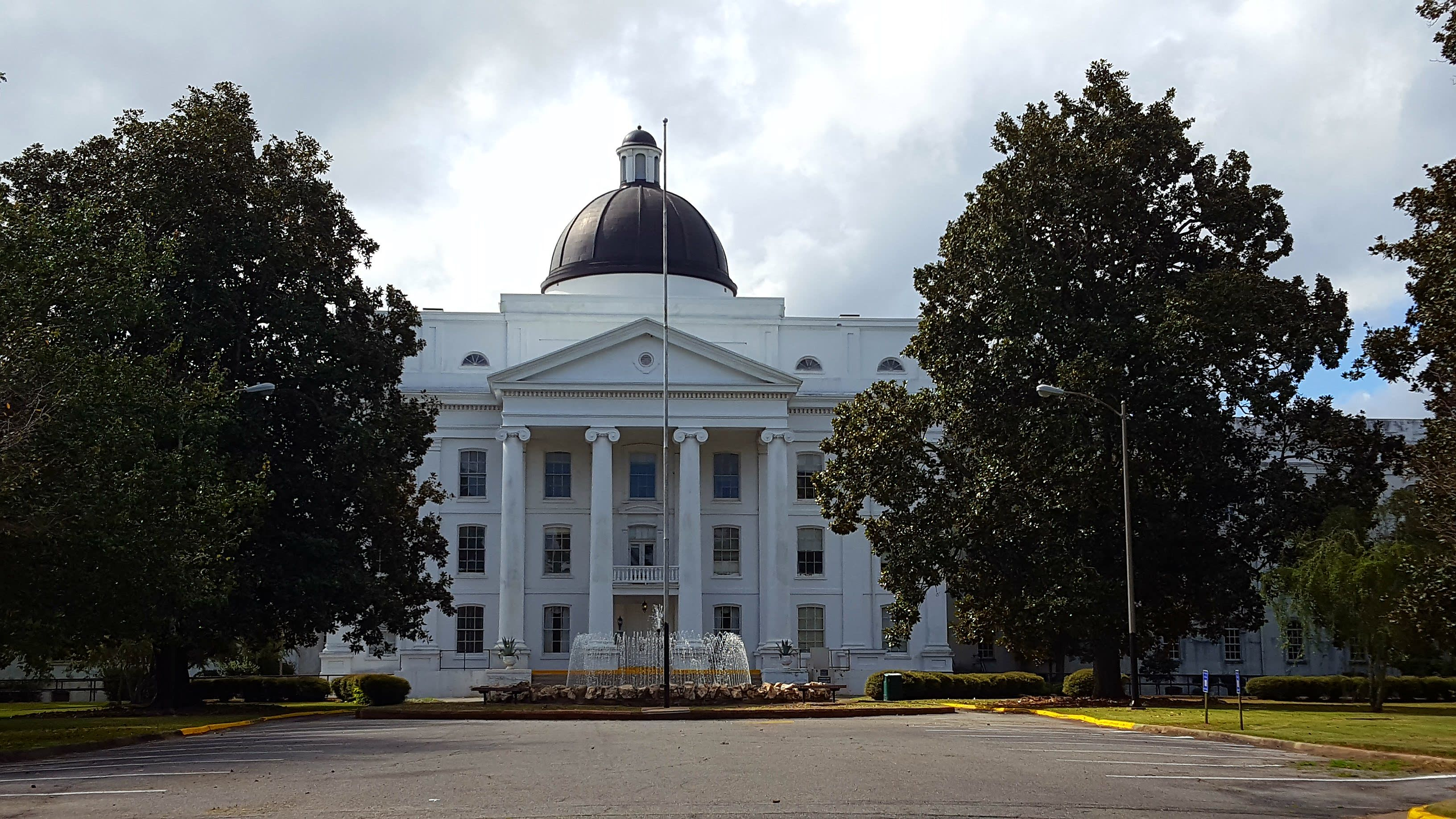
Central Building - September 2018

Under Dr. Thomas F. Green (1845–1879), care of patients was based on the "institution as family". This modeled hospitals to resemble an extended family. Green ate with staff and patients daily and abolished chain and rope restraints. Green was succeeded by Theophilus Orgain Powell (1837–1907), for whom the Powell Building was named after.

In 1960, journalist Jack Nelson of The Atlanta Constitution received the Pulitzer Prize for Local Reporting for exposing abuses at the hospital.

The hospital population grew to nearly 12,000 in the 1960s. During the following decade, the population began to decrease due to the emphasis on de-institutionalization, the addition of other public psychiatric (regional) hospitals throughout the state, the availability of psychotropic medications, an increase in community mental health programs, and many individuals moving to community living arrangements. During FY2004–FY2005, the hospital served more than 9,000 consumers (duplicates counted) – from nearly every Georgia county.

In 2010, the Georgia Department of Behavioral Health and Developmental Disabilities announced that the hospital would be closed.

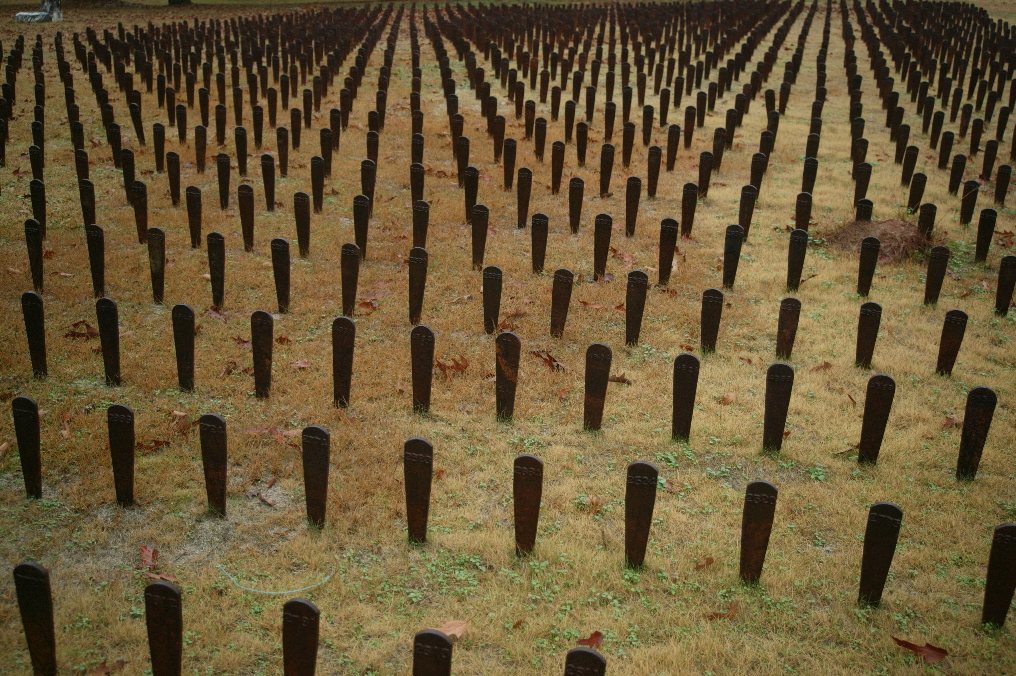
A symbolic representation of the more than 25,000 patients buried in unmarked graves throughout the hospital grounds

== Notable patients ==
- Anjette Lyles, American restaurateur responsible for the poisoning deaths of four relatives between 1952 and 1958 in Macon, Georgia, apprehended on May 6, 1958, and sentenced to death yet later was involuntarily committed due her to diagnosis of paranoid schizophrenia, died aged 52 on December 4, 1977, at the Central State Hospital, Milledgeville in Georgia.

== See also ==
- List of hospitals in the United States
- List of hospitals in Georgia
