= Sinasa massacre =

1985 mass poisoning in the Philippines

- Davao City (Philippines)
- Location: Davao City, Philippines
- Date: September 9, 1985
- Attack type: Mass poisoning; stabbing; murder–suicide
- Weapons: Insecticide; Machete; Knife
- Deaths: 68 (including the perpetrator)
- Perpetrator: Mangayanon Butaog

The Sinasa massacre was a mass poisoning and stabbing carried out by religious leader Mangayanon Butaog on September 9, 1985 in Sinasa, a village in Davao City, Philippines. A total of 68 people died including Butaog; 64 from eating poisoned gruel, and four from stab wounds. Five people survived by spitting out the gruel and pretending to be dead. Butaog decided to commit the massacre after failing to turn dry leaves from a tree into money, leading some of his followers to lose faith in him.

== Background ==
Sinasa was a village in a remote, mountainous area of Davao City, around 25 miles from city center. The inhabitants of the village – men, women, and children – were part of the Ata tribe. An estimated 200 Ata tribesmen lived in the mountainous villages near Davao in 1985. Their lifestyle typically consisted of hunting animals with bows and arrows, growing root vegetables, and wearing loincloth garments.

The leader of the village was Mangayanon Butaog, a tribal priest and shaman. Butaog once cut down a tree, promising his followers that its dry leaves would turn into money, which they could use to make transactions. After this failed, many of his followers began to question his self-proclaimed powers. A short time later, he went on an expedition to the top of the closest mountain. When he returned to the village, Butaog said that he met with the highest of gods when he reached the mountain's peak.

== Massacre ==
On September 9, 1985, Butaog prepared gruel laced with insecticide. He told his followers that after eating the meal, they would go to sleep and wake up as gods. Five people survived by spitting out gruel when Butaog was not looking, and later pretended to be dead in their homes. According to the survivors, not every villager was aware that their meals were poisoned. After everyone finished eating, they all returned to their homes and went to bed, dying in their sleep. When Butaog's wife and two children refused to eat the gruel, he murdered them with a machete before fatally stabbing himself in the abdomen with a knife.

== Aftermath ==
After the survivors of the massacre alerted local authorities, nine people, including an officer and militia members, hiked to the village on September 16, 1985. When they reached 300 yards from the village, they stopped due to the odor. Three militiamen progressed further and hastily counted the bodies and left. A more thorough search was later conducted by soldiers. The corpses were located in a bunkhouse and four huts adjacent to a creek. By the time they were discovered, the bodies had already been partially eaten by wild animals.

The massacre has often been compared to the Jonestown massacre, an incident where 909 people died after being forced to ingest poison in Guyana by their leader, Jim Jones.
