= Poison =

Substance that causes death, injury or harm to organs

The international pictogram for poisonous substances. The skull and crossbones has long been a standard symbol for poison.

In science, a poison is any chemical substance that is harmful or lethal to a living organism. The term of poison is used in a wide range of scientific fields and industries, where it is often specifically defined. It may also be applied colloquially or figuratively, with a broad sense.

The symptoms and effects of poisoning in humans can mimic those of other medical conditions and vary depending on the type of poison and the system of the body affected. Common symptoms include alterations in consciousness, abnormal body temperature, irregular heart rate, and changes in respiration. The severity and specific presentation of symptoms often depend on the nature and dose of the poison involved.

Certain poisons, particularly caustic or irritating substances, can cause direct injury to mucous membranes in the mouth, throat, gastrointestinal tract, and lungs. These injuries may result in symptoms such as pain, coughing, vomiting, and shortness of breath.

The term poisoning refers to the harmful physiological effects that result from the exposure to a toxic substance, typically through ingestion, inhalation, injection, or skin absorption. It is derived from the word poison and is commonly used in medical, biochemical, and toxicological contexts to describe adverse interactions between a substance and a living organism.

Poisoning is sometimes used as a method of self-harm and of suicide, particularly in cases of intentional self-poisoning among individuals experiencing suicidal ideation. According to Time Magazine, self-poisoning is one of the leading methods of suicide attempts among adolescents, and has been identified as the third-leading cause of suicide-related deaths in this age group. A study published in the Journal of Pediatrics found that suicide attempts by poisoning among individuals under the age of 19 doubled between 2000 and 2018, increasing from nearly 40,000 cases to almost 80,000. During the COVID-19 lockdowns, reports indicated a 37% increase in cases of deliberate self-poisoning among adolescent girls.

In biology, a poison is a chemical substance causing death, injury or harm to organisms or their parts. In medicine, poisons are a kind of toxin that are delivered passively, not actively. In industry the term may be negative, something to be removed to make a thing safe, or positive, an agent to limit unwanted pests. In ecological terms, poisons introduced into the environment can later cause unwanted effects elsewhere, or in other parts of the food chain.

== Etymology ==
The word poison was first recorded in English around the year 1200, meaning "a deadly potion or substance". It derives from the Old French poison or puison (12th century; Modern French: poison), originally meaning "a drink", particularly a medicinal one. By the 14th century, the term had come to signify "a (magic) potion" or "poisonous drink". These uses trace back to the Latin word potionem (nominative: potio), meaning "a drinking" or "a drink", and more specifically "a poisonous drink", as seen in the writings of Cicero. The Latin root comes from the verb potare, meaning "to drink".

The use of poison as an adjective in the form poisonous dates back to the 1520s. The practice of using poison in combination with plant names began in the 18th century. For example, the term poison oak was first recorded in 1743, and poison ivy appeared in usage by 1784. The expression poison gas was first used during World War I in 1915.

== Terminology ==
The term poison is often used colloquially to describe any harmful substance, especially corrosive substances, carcinogens, mutagens, teratogens, and harmful pollutants. In everyday language, it is sometimes used to exaggerate the perceived danger of certain chemicals. The 16th-century physician Paracelsus (1493–1541), regarded as the father of toxicology, famously stated: "Everything is poison, there is poison in everything. Only the dose makes a thing not a poison." (See: LD_{50}).

The term is also used in a figurative sense—for example: "His brother's presence poisoned the atmosphere at the party." In contrast, legal definitions of "poison" tend to be a little narrower. Some substances that are not legally required to carry a "poison" label may still cause medical conditions associated with poisoning.

Some poisons are also classified as toxins, which are toxic substances produced by living organisms. Examples include bacterial proteins responsible for conditions such as tetanus and botulism. While a distinction exists between "poison" and "toxin", the terms are often used interchangeably, even in scientific contexts. Related adjectives include toxic and poisonous, which are generally considered synonymous.

Poisonous substances introduced into the body by sting or bite are known as venoms. In everyday usage, a poisonous organism is one that causes harm when ingested or touched, while a venomous organism uses venom actively to incapacitate prey or deter predators. Although rare, some organisms may be both poisonous and venomous.

All living organisms produce substances to defend themselves from being eaten. However, the term "poison" typically refers to substances that are toxic to humans. Substances that are toxic primarily to pathogens and not to humans are generally classified as antibiotics. For instance, Penicillium chrysogenum produces compounds toxic to bacteria, but not to humans, making them effective as antibacterial drugs. Similarly, human antimicrobial peptides, which are toxic to viruses, fungi, bacteria, and cancerous cells; are considered part of the innate immune system.

In nuclear physics, the term nuclear poison refers to a substance that absorbs neutrons and interferes with a nuclear reaction.

Substances classified as environmentally hazardous are not always poisonous, and vice versa. For example, wastewater from food processing, such as potato juice or milk; can be environmentally damaging by depleting oxygen in aquatic ecosystems (leading to eutrophication), but it poses no direct toxic threat to humans and is not considered a poison.

From a biological standpoint, virtually any substance can be toxic in sufficient quantity. Even something as essential as water can be fatal when consumed in excessive amounts; a condition known as water intoxication. Many drugs used in medicine, such as fentanyl, have a median lethal dose (LD_{50}) only slightly higher than their effective dose (ED_{50}), highlighting the thin margin between therapeutic benefit and toxicity. Some classification systems differentiate between lethal substances with therapeutic value and those without.

== Modern definitions ==
In broad metaphorical (colloquial) usage of the term, "poison" may refer to anything deemed harmful.

In biology, poisons are substances that can cause death, injury, or harm to organs, tissues, cells, and DNA usually by chemical reactions or other activity on the molecular scale, when an organism is exposed to a sufficient quantity.

Medicinal fields (particularly veterinary medicine) and zoology often distinguish poisons from toxins and venoms. Both poisons and venoms are toxins, which are toxicants produced by organisms in nature. The difference between venom and poison is the delivery method of the toxin. Venoms are toxins that are actively delivered by being injected via a bite or sting through a venom apparatus, such as fangs or a stinger, in a process called envenomation, whereas poisons are toxins that are passively delivered by being swallowed, inhaled, or absorbed through the skin. Unantidoteable refers to toxins that cannot be neutralized by modern medical technology, regardless of their type.

== Uses ==
Industry, agriculture, and other sectors employ many poisonous substances, usually for reasons other than their toxicity to humans. Examples include medicines (e.g. anthelmintics used on chickens), solvents (e.g. rubbing alcohol, turpentine), cleaners (e.g. bleach, ammonia), coatings (e.g. arsenic wallpaper), and feedstocks. The toxicity itself sometimes has economic value, when it serves agricultural purposes such as weed control and pest control.

Most poisonous industrial compounds have associated material safety data sheets and are classified as hazardous substances. Hazardous substances are subject to extensive regulation on production, procurement, and use in overlapping domains of occupational safety and health, public health, drinking water quality standards, air pollution, and environmental protection. Due to the mechanics of molecular diffusion, many poisonous compounds rapidly diffuse into biological tissues, air, water, or soil on a molecular scale. By the principle of entropy, chemical contamination is typically costly or infeasible to reverse, unless specific chelating agents or micro-filtration processes are available. Chelating agents are often broader in scope than the acute target, and therefore their ingestion necessitates careful medical or veterinarian supervision.

Pesticides are one group of substances whose prime purpose is their toxicity to various insects and other animals deemed to be pests (e.g., rats and cockroaches). Natural pesticides have been used for this purpose for thousands of years (e.g. concentrated table salt is toxic to many slugs and snails). Bioaccumulation of chemically-prepared agricultural insecticides is a matter of concern for the many species, especially birds, which consume insects as a primary food source. Selective toxicity, controlled application, and controlled biodegradation are major challenges in herbicide and pesticide development and in chemical engineering generally, as all lifeforms on earth share an underlying biochemistry; organisms exceptional in their environmental resilience are classified as extremophiles, these for the most part exhibiting radically different susceptibilities.

== Ecological lifetime ==
A poison which enters the food chain—whether of industrial, agricultural, or natural origin—might not be immediately toxic to the first organism that ingests the toxin, but can become further concentrated in predatory organisms further up the food chain, particularly carnivores and omnivores, especially concerning fat soluble poisons which tend to become stored in biological tissue rather than excreted in urine or other water-based effluents.

Apart from food, many poisons readily enter the body through the skin and lungs. Hydrofluoric acid is a notorious contact poison, in addition to its corrosive damage. Naturally occurring sour gas is a fast-acting atmospheric poison, which can be released by volcanic activity or drilling rigs. Plant-based contact irritants, such as that possessed by poison ivy, are often classed as allergens rather than poisons; the effect of an allergen being not a poison as such, but to turn the body's natural defenses against itself. Poison can also enter the body through faulty medical implants, or by injection (which is the basis of lethal injection in the context of capital punishment).

In 2013, 3.3 million cases of unintentional human poisonings occurred. This resulted in 98,000 deaths worldwide, down from 120,000 deaths in 1990. In modern society, cases of suspicious death elicit the attention of the Coroner's office and forensic investigators.

Of increasing concern since the isolation of natural radium by Marie and Pierre Curie in 1898—and the subsequent advent of nuclear physics and nuclear technologies—are radiological poisons. These are associated with ionizing radiation, a mode of toxicity distinct from chemically active poisons. In mammals, chemical poisons are often passed from mother to offspring through the placenta during gestation, or through breast milk during nursing. In contrast, radiological damage can be passed from mother or father to offspring through genetic mutation, which—if not fatal in miscarriage or childhood, or a direct cause of infertility—can then be passed along again to a subsequent generation. Atmospheric radon is a natural radiological poison of increasing impact since humans moved from hunter-gatherer lifestyles and cave dwelling to increasingly enclosed structures able to contain radon in dangerous concentrations. The 2006 poisoning of Alexander Litvinenko was a notable use of radiological assassination, presumably meant to evade the normal investigation of chemical poisons.

Poisons widely dispersed into the environment are known as pollution. These are often of human origin, but pollution can also include unwanted biological processes such as toxic red tide, or acute changes to the natural chemical environment attributed to invasive species, which are toxic or detrimental to the prior ecology (especially if the prior ecology was associated with human economic value or an established industry such as shellfish harvesting).

The scientific disciplines of ecology and environmental resource management study the environmental life cycle of toxic compounds and their complex, diffuse, and highly interrelated effects.

== Poisoning ==
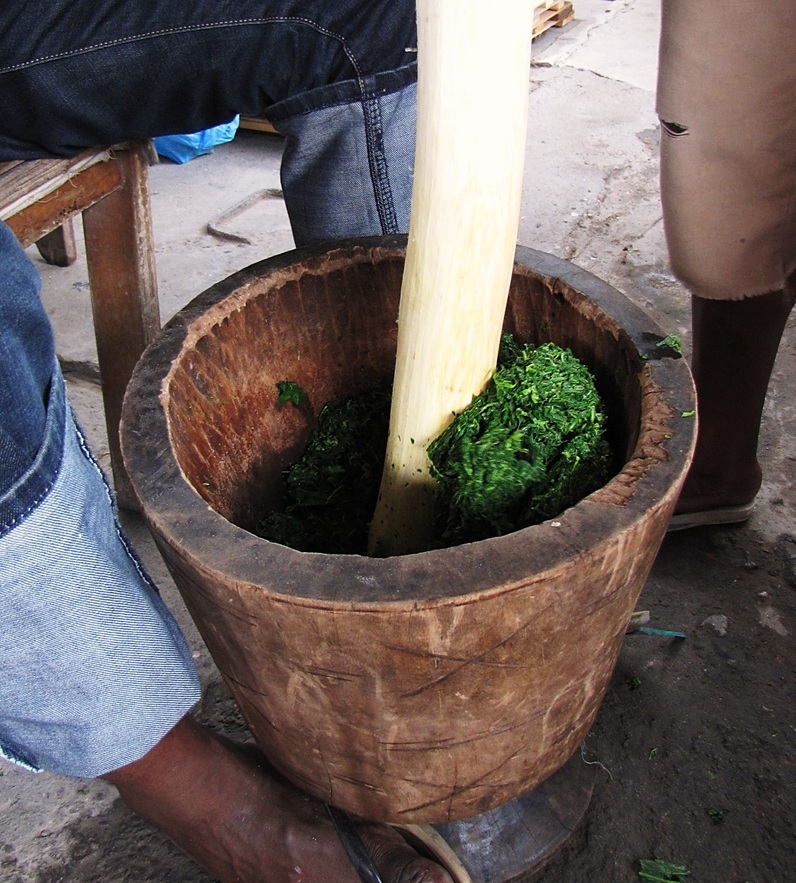
Cassava leaves contain cyanide and can thus cause poisoning if not prepared correctly.

Poisoning can be either acute or chronic, and caused by a variety of natural or synthetic substances. Substances that destroy tissue but do not absorb, such as lye, are classified as corrosives rather than poisons.

=== Acute ===
Acute poisoning is exposure to a poison on one occasion or during a short period of time. Symptoms develop in close relation to the exposure. Absorption of a poison is necessary for systemic poisoning. Furthermore, many common household medications are not labeled with skull and crossbones, although they can cause severe illness or even death. Poisoning can be caused by excessive consumption of generally safe substances, as in the case of water intoxication.

Agents that act on the nervous system can paralyze in seconds or less, and include both biologically derived neurotoxins and so-called nerve gases, which may be synthesized for warfare or industry.

Inhaled or ingested cyanide, used as a method of execution in gas chambers, or as a suicide method, almost instantly starves the body of energy by inhibiting the enzymes in mitochondria that make ATP. Intravenous injection of an unnaturally high concentration of potassium chloride, such as in the execution of prisoners in parts of the United States, quickly stops the heart by eliminating the cell potential necessary for muscle contraction.

Most biocides, including pesticides, are created to act as acute poisons to target organisms, although acute or less observable chronic poisoning can also occur in non-target organisms (secondary poisoning), including the humans who apply the biocides and other beneficial organisms. For example, the herbicide 2,4-D imitates the action of a plant hormone, which makes its lethal toxicity specific to plants. Indeed, 2,4-D is not a poison, but classified as "harmful" (EU).

Many substances regarded as poisons are toxic only indirectly, by toxication. An example is "wood alcohol" or methanol, which is not poisonous itself, but is chemically converted to toxic formaldehyde and formic acid in the liver. Many drug molecules are made toxic in the liver, and the genetic variability of certain liver enzymes makes the toxicity of many compounds differ between individuals.

Exposure to radioactive substances can produce radiation poisoning, an unrelated phenomenon.

Two common cases of acute natural poisoning are theobromine poisoning of dogs and cats, and mushroom poisoning in humans. Dogs and cats are not natural herbivores, but a chemical defense developed by Theobroma cacao can be incidentally fatal nevertheless. Many omnivores, including humans, readily consume edible fungi, and thus many fungi have evolved to become decisively inedible, in this case as a direct defense.

=== Chronic ===
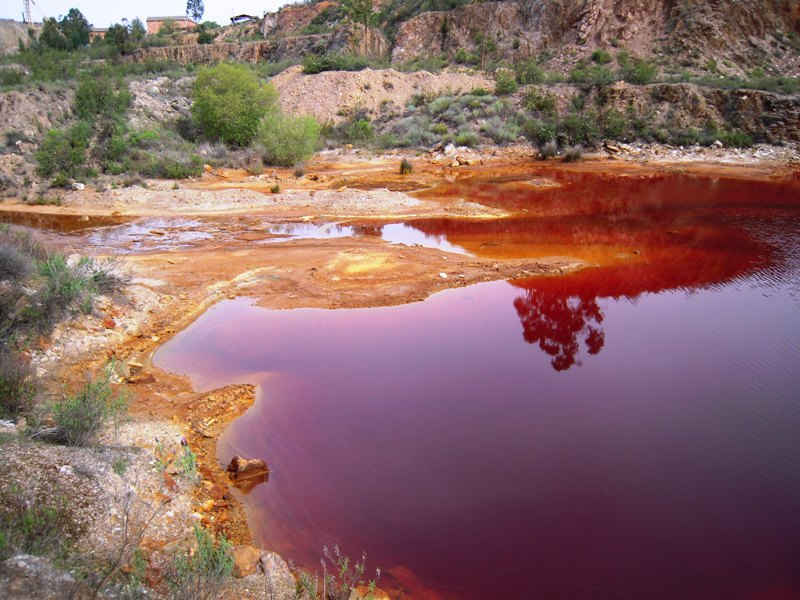
Polluted groundwater, in this case depicting acid mine drainage, can cause chronic poisoning.

Chronic poisoning is long-term repeated or continuous exposure to a poison where symptoms do not occur immediately or after each exposure. The person gradually becomes ill, or becomes ill after a long latent period. Chronic poisoning most commonly occurs following exposure to poisons that bioaccumulate, or are biomagnified, such as mercury, gadolinium, and lead.

== Management ==
- Initial management for all poisonings includes ensuring adequate cardiopulmonary function and providing treatment for any symptoms such as seizures, shock, and pain.
- Injected poisons (e.g., from the sting of animals) can be treated by binding the affected body part with a pressure bandage and placing the affected body part in hot water (with a temperature of 50 °C). The pressure bandage prevents the poison being pumped throughout the body, and the hot water breaks it down. This treatment, however, only works with poisons composed of protein-molecules.
- In the majority of poisonings the mainstay of management is providing supportive care for the patient, i.e., treating the symptoms rather than the poison.

=== Decontamination ===
- Treatment of a recently ingested poison may involve gastric decontamination to decrease absorption. Gastric decontamination can involve activated charcoal, gastric lavage, whole bowel irrigation, or nasogastric aspiration. Routine use of emetics (syrup of Ipecac), cathartics or laxatives are no longer recommended.
  - Activated charcoal is the treatment of choice to prevent poison absorption. It is usually administered when the patient is in the emergency room or by a trained emergency healthcare provider such as a Paramedic or EMT. However, charcoal is ineffective against metals such as sodium, potassium, and lithium, and alcohols and glycols; it is also not recommended for ingestion of corrosive chemicals such as acids and alkalis.
  - Cathartics were postulated to decrease absorption by increasing the expulsion of the poison from the gastrointestinal tract. There are two types of cathartics used in poisoned patients; saline cathartics (sodium sulfate, magnesium citrate, magnesium sulfate) and saccharide cathartics (sorbitol). They do not appear to improve patient outcome and are no longer recommended.
  - Emesis (i.e. induced by ipecac) is no longer recommended in poisoning situations, because vomiting is ineffective at removing poisons.
  - Gastric lavage, commonly known as a stomach pump, is the insertion of a tube into the stomach, followed by administration of water or saline down the tube. The liquid is then removed along with the contents of the stomach. Lavage has been used for many years as a common treatment for poisoned patients. However, a recent review of the procedure in poisonings suggests no benefit. It is still sometimes used if it can be performed within 1 hour of ingestion and the exposure is potentially life-threatening.
  - Nasogastric aspiration involves the placement of a tube via the nose down into the stomach, the stomach contents are then removed by suction. This procedure is mainly used for liquid ingestions where activated charcoal is ineffective, e.g. ethylene glycol poisoning.
  - Whole bowel irrigation cleanses the bowel. This is achieved by giving the patient large amounts of a polyethylene glycol solution. The osmotically balanced polyethylene glycol solution is not absorbed into the body, having the effect of flushing out the entire gastrointestinal tract. Its major uses are to treat ingestion of sustained release drugs, toxins not absorbed by activated charcoal (e.g., lithium, iron), and for removal of ingested drug packets (body packing/smuggling).

=== Enhanced excretion ===
- In some situations elimination of the poison can be enhanced using diuresis, hemodialysis, hemoperfusion, hyperbaric medicine, peritoneal dialysis, exchange transfusion or chelation. However, this may actually worsen the poisoning in some cases, so it should always be verified based on what substances are involved.

== Epidemiology ==
In 2010, poisoning resulted in about 180,000 deaths down from 200,000 in 1990. There were approximately 727,500 emergency department visits in the United States involving poisonings—3.3% of all injury-related encounters.

== Applications ==
Poisonous compounds may be useful either for their toxicity, or, more often, because of another chemical property, such as specific chemical reactivity. Poisons are widely used in industry and agriculture, as chemical reagents, solvents or complexing reagents, e.g. carbon monoxide, methanol and sodium cyanide, respectively. They are less common in household use, with occasional exceptions such as ammonia and methanol. For instance, phosgene is a highly reactive nucleophile acceptor, which makes it an excellent reagent for polymerizing diols and diamines to produce polycarbonate and polyurethane plastics. For this use, millions of tons are produced annually. However, the same reactivity makes it also highly reactive towards proteins in human tissue and thus highly toxic. In fact, phosgene has been used as a chemical weapon. It can be contrasted with mustard gas, which has only been produced for chemical weapons uses, as it has no particular industrial use.

Biocides need not be poisonous to humans, because they can target metabolic pathways absent in humans, leaving only incidental toxicity. For instance, the herbicide 2,4-dichlorophenoxyacetic acid is a mimic of a plant growth hormone, which causes uncontrollable growth leading to the death of the plant. Humans and animals, lacking this hormone and its receptor, are unaffected by this, and need to ingest relatively large doses before any toxicity appears. Human toxicity is, however, hard to avoid with pesticides targeting mammals, such as rodenticides.

The risk from toxicity is also distinct from toxicity itself. For instance, the preservative thiomersal used in vaccines is toxic, but the quantity administered in a single shot is negligible.

Deaths from poisonings per million persons in 2012
0-2
3-5
6-7
8-10
11-12
13-19
20-27
28-41
42-55
56-336

Disability-adjusted life year for poisonings per 100,000 inhabitants in 2004.
no data
<10
10–90
90–170
170–250
250–330
330–410
410–490
490–570
570–650
650–700
700–880
>880

== History ==
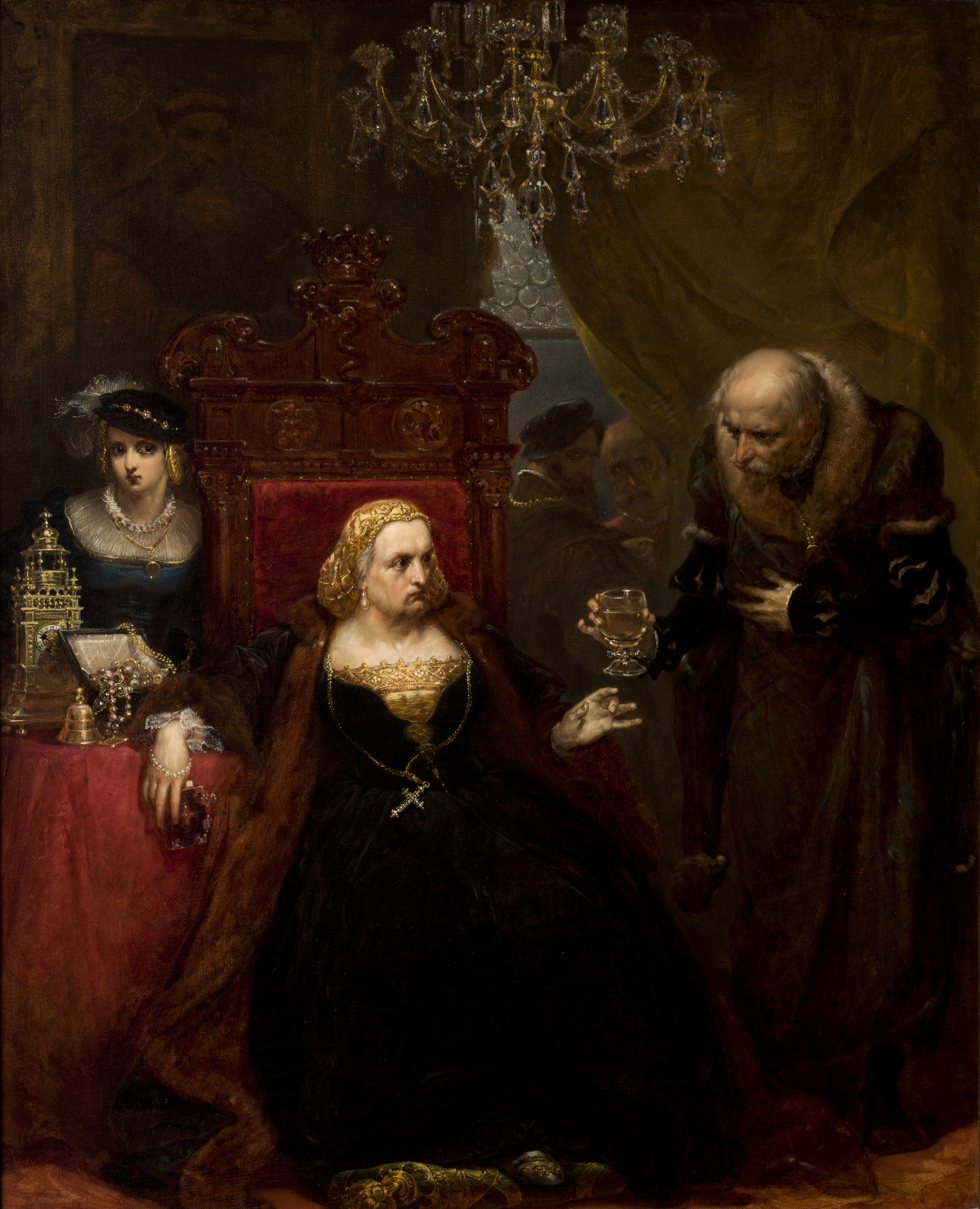
Poisoning of Queen Bona by Jan Matejko.

Throughout human history, intentional application of poison has been used as a method of murder, pest-control, suicide, and execution. As a method of execution, poison has been ingested, as the ancient Athenians did (see Socrates), inhaled, as with carbon monoxide or hydrogen cyanide (see gas chamber), injected (see lethal injection), or even as an enema. Poison's lethal effect can be combined with its allegedly magical powers; an example is the Chinese gu poison. Poison was also employed in gunpowder warfare. For example, the 14th-century Chinese text of the Huolongjing written by Jiao Yu outlined the use of a poisonous gunpowder mixture to fill cast iron grenade bombs.

While arsenic is a naturally occurring environmental poison, its artificial concentrate was once nicknamed inheritance powder. In Medieval Europe, it was common for monarchs to employ personal food tasters to thwart royal assassination, in the dawning age of the Apothecary.

== Figurative use ==
The term poison is also used in a figurative sense. The slang sense of alcoholic drink is first attested 1805, American English (e.g., a bartender might ask a customer "what's your poison?" or "Pick your poison"). Figurative use of the term dates from the late 15th century. Figuratively referring to persons as poison dates from 1910. The figurative term poison pen letter became well known in 1913 by a notorious criminal case in Pennsylvania, U.S.; the phrase dates to 1898. Despite the plants of the Toxicodendron family having the names poison ivy and poison oak, the oil urushiol they produce is not a true poison and is actually an allergen, which 15% of people are resistant to.

== See also ==
- Agency for Toxic Substances and Disease Registry (ATSDR) – US federal agency
- Antidote – Substance that can counteract a form of poisoning
- Biosecurity – Preventive measures designed to reduce the risk of infectious disease transmission
- Contaminated haemophilia blood products – Health crisis in the late 1970s up to 1985
- Food taster – Person ingesting food prepared for someone else to ensure it's safe to eat
- Infection – Invasion of an organism's body by pathogenic agents
- EPA list of extremely hazardous substances
- Lists of poisonings
- List of poisonous plants
- List of types of poison
- Mr. Yuk – Label that indicates poisonous material
- Poison ring – Ring with concealed compartment which could be used to store poison
- Saxitoxin – Paralytic shellfish toxin
- Toxics use reduction – Approach to pollution prevention
- Toxic waste – Any unwanted material which can cause harm
