= Theophilus Orgain Powell =

American physician (1837–1907)

- Born: March 21, 1837; Brunswick County, Virginia
- Died: Tate Springs, Georgia
- Resting place: Milledgeville
- Occupation: Superintendent of the Georgia State Sanitarium

Theophilus Orgain Powell (21 March 1837 – 18 August 1907) was a physician who served as the superintendent of the Georgia State Sanitarium from 1862 until his death. He assumed this role after working as the Assistant Surgeon to the 49th Georgia Infantry Regiment during the American Civil War. Powell held racist views about African American patients that were influential during his era.

== Biography ==
Theophilus Orgain Powell was born on 21 March 1837 in Brunswick County, Virginia. His father was Colonel Marcus D. Powell, a planter, and his mother was Elizabeth Orgain Powell. He was of English descent; one of his ancestors was Nathaniel Powell.

He was educated in Sparta, Georgia, at Richard Malcolm Johnson's school. In 1859, he graduated from the Medical College of Georgia and began practicing in Sparta.

Powell was a member of the Confederate Army during the American Civil War. He served as Assistant Surgeon to the 49th Georgia Infantry Regiment. He served until August 1862, when he became the assistant physician at the Georgia State Sanitarium in Milledgeville.

He became the superintendent of the Georgia State Sanitarium after the death of T.F. Green created the vacancy, and he served in this post for the rest of his life. Under Powell's authority, it became one of the biggest state hospitals in the United States. As superintendent, Powell implemented occupational therapy. He upheld Green's racist hospital policies, and he did not believe in germ theory. The sanitarium was thus overcrowded and unsanitary. Records from his tenure showed that African American patients experienced high rates of tuberculosis and pellagra.

Powell's writings, particularly about the "colored insane", has been described as influential by Dr. Diana Martha Louis. He believed that African Americans had a natural tendency towards madness and alcoholism. In 1897, he said that before the Civil War, "There were comparatively speaking, few Negro lunatics. Following their sudden emancipation, their number of insane began to multiply."

Powell was the president of the Georgia Medical Association in 1887 and the Medico-Psychological Association in 1898. He was active in the Methodist Church and he was also a Mason.

He married Frances Augusta Birdsong on 12 January 1860. They had two children named Julia and Harriet Summers.

Powell died from pneumonia on 18 August 1907 in Tate Springs, Georgia. Upon his death, he was recognised as Georgia's "greatest philanthropist." His remains were buried in the Milledgeville cemetery. After his death, his position as the superintendent of the Georgia State Sanitarium was assumed by Loderick Jones. The Powell Building in the Central State Hospital was named after him.
