= Michael Tuomey (politician) =

American politician

Michael Tuomey (1819–1887), was a nineteenth-century New York City civil servant and politician.

Tuomey was a long-time politician in the rough-and-tumble world of ward heelers and shoulder hitters of mid-nineteenth-century New York City and became nationally known for blocking sanitary laws and regulations, most notably in the area of clean milk for children.

== History ==
Tuomey was born circa 1819 in the city's fourteenth ward where he established his political base. As a youth he developed ties to local meat markets and became known as "Butcher Mike." He worked as a butcher, hat trimmer, and a keeper of a public house called the Fourteenth Ward House at Grand Street and Elizabeth Streets. Later, he established the firm of Tuomey and Elder that engaged in the steam heating and ventilation business. He eventually moved to an up-scale home at 218 West Fifty-third Street where he ran a stable and lived with a wife, three sons, and a daughter.

Although short of stature, he was quite strong and became known locally as a bare-fisted fighter which, in turn, brought him to the attention of local political authorities with ties to New York City's notorious machine, Tammany Hall. He rose in Tammany Hall through the 1840s and eventually ran for Congress but lost. He was elected to New York City's Board of Aldermen to represent the fourteenth ward in 1858 and served until 1862, and, later in 1876, was elected again to the Eighth District for one term. For many years he was on Tammany Hall's General Committee, was a delegate to the Democratic National Convention in Charleston and an elector on the Stephen Douglas ticket both in 1860.

=== Milk scandal ===
Tuomey was most remembered for his obstruction of investigations into the "Swill milk scandal", a public health and animal cruelty scandal that erupted in New York City during the summer of 1858. In May, 1858, Frank Leslie's Illustrated Newspaper did a landmark exposé of the distillery-dairies of Manhattan and Brooklyn that marketed so-called swill milk that came from cows fed on distillery waste and then adulterated with water, eggs, flour, and other ingredients that increased the volume and masked the adulteration. Swill milk dairies were noted for their filthy conditions and overpowering stench both caused by the close confinement of hundreds (sometimes thousands) of cows in narrow stalls where, once they were tied, they would stay for the rest of their lives, often standing in their own manure, covered with flies and sores, and suffering from a range of virulent diseases. These cows were fed on boiling distillery waste, often leaving the cows with rotting teeth and other maladies. The milk drawn from the cows was routinely adulterated with water, rotten eggs, flour, burnt sugar and other adulterants with the finished product then marketed falsely as "pure country milk" or "Orange County Milk."

Frank Leslie's exposé caused widespread public outrage and local politicians were strongly pressured to punish and regulate the distillery-dairies. Tuomey assumed a central role in the ensuing investigations, and, with fellow Aldermen E. Harrison Reed and William Tucker, shielded the dairies and turned the hearings into one-sided exercises designed to make dairy critics and established health authorities look ridiculous, even going to the extent of arguing that swill milk was actually as good or better for children than regular milk. With Reed and others, Tuomey successfully blocked any serious inquiry into the dairies and stymied calls for reform. For the rest of his career, he was caricatured as "Swill Milk" Tuomey.

Tuomey's obstruction and his larger political career were typical of the way Tammany Hall officials dealt with many public health, urban and electoral reform issues in the mid-nineteenth century. Tuomey died of a sudden heart attack on May 2, 1887, and was buried at Calvary Cemetery three days later.

== Sources ==
To date, there are no scholarly or even popular treatments of Michael Tuomey. The best primary sources are to be found in articles published by the New York Times and the original exposés in Frank Leslie's Illustrated Newspaper. Of these, the following are especially relevant.

- "They Ought to be Beaten: 'Swill-Milk' Tuomey," New York Times (October 29, 1878), p. 8.
- "Suddenly Dropping Dead: Michael Tuomey's Varied Career Brought to a Close," New York Times (May 3, 1887), p. 8.
- “Our Exposure of the Swill Milk Trade,” Frank Leslie's Illustrated Newspaper (June 12, 1858).
- “Our Exposure of the Swill Milk Trade,” Frank Leslie's Illustrated Newspaper (July 10, 1858).
