= Obituary (short story) =

1959 science fiction short story by Isaac Asimov

"Obituary" is a science fiction short story by American writer Isaac Asimov. It was first published in the August 1959 issue of The Magazine of Fantasy and Science Fiction and reprinted in Asimov's 1968 collection Asimov's Mysteries.

The story originated when Asimov read the obituary of his friend Cyril Kornbluth in The New York Times, and found himself feeling envy at the size and prominence of Kornbluth's obituary and frustration at the knowledge that he would never know whether his own obituary would be equally prominent. Nine months after Kornbluth's death, Asimov decided to exorcise his feelings by writing this story. Discussing "Obituary" in his autobiography, Asimov notes that it is the only story he wrote with a female narrator.

== Plot summary ==
The story is narrated by the unnamed wife of an independently wealthy theoretical physicist named Lancelot Stebbins. Stebbins is a bitter man who feels frustration at his lack of fame in his chosen field, and after twenty-five years of marriage, his wife is increasingly unhappy with the state of affairs. At one point when she had remarked that he could at least expect some fame when his obituary appeared, Stebbins responded by screaming that he would never get to read it, and then spitting at her.

One morning, Stebbins announces that he has made a discovery that will ensure his lasting fame as a physicist. He gives his lab assistants a month's vacation to ensure that he will not have to share the credit with them, then enlists his wife's help. In the laboratory, Stebbins shows his wife an iron crucible with a white mouse in it. Stebbins then creates a second crucible and mouse by creating a duplicate of them five minutes into the future and then transporting the duplicates back into the present. The mouse in the duplicate crucible, however, is dead. After five minutes, the duplicate crucible and mouse disappear, leaving only the original.

Stebbins plans to create a duplicate of himself by the same process. The duplicate will be dead, of course, and Stebbins plans to have his wife announce his death. After his funeral, he will announce to the world that he is still alive and that his apparent death was the result of his discovery. The surrounding publicity will ensure that Stebbins will always be remembered for his discovery. He warns his wife that if anything goes wrong with his plan, he will kill her.

Stebbins carries out his plan. He creates a duplicate of himself three days in the future, then brings it back to the present, where it falls dead to the floor. Stebbins and his wife move the body to a room in the laboratory that has been arranged to look as though a reaction involving potassium cyanide got out of control. Stebbins then hides in another room with a three-day supply of food and water while his wife calls a doctor. The doctor calls the police, who rule the death an accident and leave. Mrs. Stebbins then notifies the media, and several reporters come to the laboratory, where she gives them information about how wonderful and brilliant Stebbins was.

Stebbins reads his obituaries with relish, and begins planning a career as the Great Man of temporal studies, to his wife's dismay. Per his instructions, she has the dead duplicate brought to the laboratory and displayed in an open casket. On the third day, the body in the casket disappears on schedule, and Stebbins has his wife make him a cup of coffee to celebrate. Mrs. Stebbins puts cyanide in the coffee instead of sugar, killing Stebbins, and she puts his body in the casket in place of the duplicate and proceeds with his funeral. She feels no remorse about his murder; after all, he did have the satisfaction of reading his own obituary.

== Sources ==
- Asimov, Isaac, In Joy Still Felt, Doubleday, 1980. ISBN 0-385-15544-1
