= 2017 Malawat poisoning =

2017 mass poisoning in Pakistan

In the 2017 Malawat poisoning, seventeen Pakistanis in the village of Malawat, Punjab, Pakistan died from poisoning allegedly stemming from a botched attempt to escape a forced marriage.

== Incident ==
Around October 2017 police accused 21-year-old Aasia (alt. Asiya) Bibi, her alleged boyfriend Muhammad Shahid, and her aunt of conspiring to mix rat poison into Aasia's husband's milk. According to the police, her husband refused the glass of milk, whereupon Aasia's mother-in-law innocently added the poisoned milk to a family vat, and used the milk in the vat the next day to make lassi (a yogurt drink) and butter. The lassi was then served during a family gathering. The poisoned family members were first treated by a hakim (a local traditional doctor) but were subsequently hospitalized in the city of Multan. Of 27 participants who were hospitalized, 17 people died, including the 23-year-old husband, Muhammad Amjad.

Initially, it was claimed that a lizard had fallen into the milk and poisoned it. According to Jam Abdul Razzaq Klasra, a local police official, Ms. Bibi was the only person at the family gathering who did not drink the milk. During interrogation, Aasia allegedly confessed to poisoning the milk, and implicated her aunt and Shahid in the plot. Police have detained Aasia under antiterrorism laws.

=== Alleged motive ===
The couple had been married six months prior to the incident. Aasia has stated that she had begged her parents not to force her to marry, but her pleas were ignored. Police believe Aasia poisoned her husband to escape this forced marriage. Arranged marriages are common in rural Pakistan; offspring who attempt to defy an arranged marriage and instead "marry for love" are, in rare occasions, killed by family members. Salman Sufi, an aide in the Punjab provincial government, stated that conflicts centered on forced marriage often lead to "a severely fractured relationship between spouses or catastrophic aftereffects, like we witnessed in this case". There is little legal remedy for women who reject a partner chosen for them by their family.

According to The Telegraph, cases of poisoning are common in Punjab; as recently as September 2017, a newlywed couple were poisoned by the bride's family for unknown reasons.

=== Legal proceedings ===
Bibi was convicted of the poisoning in November 2018 and sentenced to serve 15 life terms. Her aunt was also convicted and given multiple life sentences.

== See also ==
- List of poisonings
