= Anjette Lyles =

American serial killer

- Born: Anjette Donovan; August 23, 1925; Macon, Georgia, U.S.
- Died: December 4, 1977 (aged 52); Central State Hospital, Milledgeville, Georgia, U.S.
- Spouses: Ben Lyles (m. 1947; died 1952) Joe Neal Gabbert (m. 1955; died 1955)
- Status: Deceased
- Conviction: Murder
- Penalty: Death; commuted to involuntary commitment

Details
- Victims: 4
- Span of crimes: 1952–1958
- Country: United States
- State: Georgia
- Date apprehended: May 6, 1958

Anjette Lyles (née Donovan; August 23, 1925 – December 4, 1977) was an American restaurateur and serial killer responsible for the poisoning deaths of four relatives in Macon, Georgia, between 1952 and 1958. Initially sentenced to death upon her conviction, Lyles was eventually diagnosed with paranoid schizophrenia and the Georgia State Board of Pardons and Paroles commuted her death sentence to commitment to the Central State Hospital in Milledgeville, where she spent the rest of her life.

== Biography ==
In 1947 she married Ben F. Lyles Jr., who owned the Lyles Restaurant in downtown Macon. She had two daughters with him: Marcia in 1948 and Carla in 1951. Ben died on January 25, 1952.

In 1955, Lyles began dating Joe Neal "Buddy" Gabbert, a pilot for Capitol Airways. Gabbert died on December 2, 1955. With the inherited money, Lyles bought a new car and house.

After the death of her first mother-in-law and her daughter Marcia's death, people began to be suspicious of her. An investigation in 1958 revealed that the three bodies had died from arsenic poisoning. The arsenic had been found to have been given over a period of time to the victims by having them ingest small doses.

On May 6, 1958, Lyles was arrested and charges with four counts of murder.

The victims were first husband Ben F. Lyles Jr., second husband Joe Neal Gabbert, Ben Lyles' mother Julia, and elder daughter Marcia Lyles. The motive for their murders was found to be financial gain.
