= Swill milk scandal =

Adulterated food scandal in the 1850s

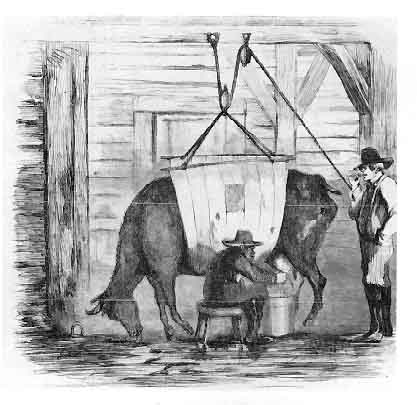
A 19th-century illustration of "swill milk" being produced: a sickly cow being milked while held up by ropes.

The swill milk scandal was a major adulterated food scandal in the state of New York in the 1850s. The New York Times reported an estimate that in one year, 8,000 infants died from swill milk.

== Name ==
Swill milk referred to milk from cows fed swill, which was residual mash from nearby distilleries. The milk was whitened with plaster of Paris, thickened with starch and eggs, and hued with molasses.

The wet grain solids left behind from fermentation and distillation retain some nutritive value. Therefore, keeping cows stabled near distilleries and feeding them with swill was an economic advantage.

== History ==
As the population of New York City exploded in the antebellum period, a time when safe drinking water was scarce, the demand for milk soared. But as the city expanded and real estate prices climbed, the meadows necessary to raise hay-fed cattle moved farther from its markets. The cost of bringing fresh milk to customers in the city became prohibitive and threatened to restrict its supply to relatively wealthy inhabitants. For the same sanitary reasons that made milk popular, Americans consumed alcohol at the highest per capita rates in US history, and New York City was home to a large number of distilleries. Distilleries in London had experimented with feeding the waste product of their industry—the fermented mash of rye, barley, and wheat commonly referred to as "swill"—to cattle with some success, and New York City distillers soon followed suit. The milk from swill-fed cows, produced in dense urban areas and often priced as low as 6 cents per quart, was affordable to most of New York City's poorest residents.

Growing attention to the poor and unsanitary conditions of city dairies emerged notably in the 1840s, with the publication of Robert M. Hartley's essay on the topic. Other exposés followed, decrying the terrible conditions of swill milk production, urban dairies, adulteration of milk, and the extensive public health consequences.

The New York Academy of Medicine carried out an examination and established the connection of swill milk with the increased infant mortality in the city. The topic of swill milk was also well exposed in pamphlets and caricatures of the time.

In May 1858, Frank Leslie's Illustrated Newspaper did a landmark exposé of the distillery-dairies of Manhattan and Brooklyn that marketed so-called swill milk that came from cows fed on distillery waste and then adulterated with water, eggs, flour, and other ingredients that increased the volume and masked the adulteration. Swill milk dairies were noted for their filthy conditions and overpowering stench both caused by the close confinement of hundreds (sometimes thousands) of cows in narrow stalls where, once farmers tied them, they would stay for the rest of their lives, often standing in their own manure, covered with flies and sores, and suffering from a range of virulent diseases. These cows were fed boiling distillery waste, often leaving the cows with rotting teeth and other maladies. The milk drawn from the cows was routinely adulterated with water, rotten eggs, flour, burnt sugar, and other adulterants with the finished product then marketed falsely as "pure country milk" or "Orange County Milk".

In an editorial published at the height of the scandal, the New York Times described swill milk as "that bluish, white compound of true milk, pus and dirty water, which, on standing, deposits a yellowish, brown sediment, that is manufactured in the stables attached to large distilleries by running the refuse distillery slops through the udders of dying cows and over the unwashed hands of milkers..."

Frank Leslie's exposé caused widespread public outrage that strongly pressured local politicians to punish and regulate the distillery-dairies, which were formally complained to be "swill milk nuisance". The Tammany Hall politician Alderman Michael Tuomey, known as "Butcher Mike", defended the distillers vigorously throughout the scandal—in fact, he was put in charge of the Board of Health investigation. Frank Leslie's Illustrated Newspaper staked out distillery owner Bradish Johnson's mansion at 21st and Broadway and reported that amid the investigation, Tuomey was observed making late-night visits. Tuomey assumed a central role in the ensuing investigations and, with fellow Aldermen E. Harrison Reed and William Tucker, shielded the dairies and turned the hearings into one-sided exercises designed to make dairy critics and established health authorities look ridiculous, even going to the extent of arguing that swill milk was as good or better for children than regular milk. With Reed and others, Tuomey successfully blocked any serious inquiry into the dairies and stymied calls for reform. The Board of Health exonerated the distillers, but public outcry led to the passage of the first food safety laws in the form of milk regulations in 1862. Tuomey became known for his attempts to block the new regulations, and earned the new moniker "Swill Milk" Tuomey. In addition to Tuomey's assistance in clearing up the unclean image milk developed, Robert Milham Hartley, a social reformist, aided in the restoration of milk being a nutritional and safe-to-drink beverage. During the mid to late nineteenth century, Hartley utilized Biblical references in his essays to appeal to the urban community. He asserted that universal milk consumption could help alleviate society's "sins", poverty, and alcohol consumption.

== See also ==
- 2008 Chinese milk scandal
