= List of types of poison =

The following is a list of types of poison by intended use:

- Biocide – a chemical substance capable of killing living organisms, usually in a selective way
  - Fungicide – a chemical compound or biological organism used to kill or inhibit fungi or fungal spores
  - Microbicide – any compound or substance whose purpose is to reduce the infectivity of microbes
    - Germicide – a disinfectant
      - Bactericide – a substance that kills bacteria
      - Viricide – a chemical agent which "kills" viruses outside the body
  - Herbicide – a substance used to kill unwanted plants
  - Parasiticide – any substance used to kill parasites
  - Pesticide – a substance or mixture of substances used to kill a pest
    - Acaricide – a pesticide that kills mites
    - Insecticide – a pesticide used against insects
    - Molluscicide – a pesticide that kills molluscs
    - Nematocide – a type of chemical pesticide used to kill parasitic nematodes (roundworms)
    - Rodenticide – a category of pest control chemicals intended to kill rodents
- Spermicide – a substance that kills sperm
