= Swill =

Liquid (or partially liquid) food for animals

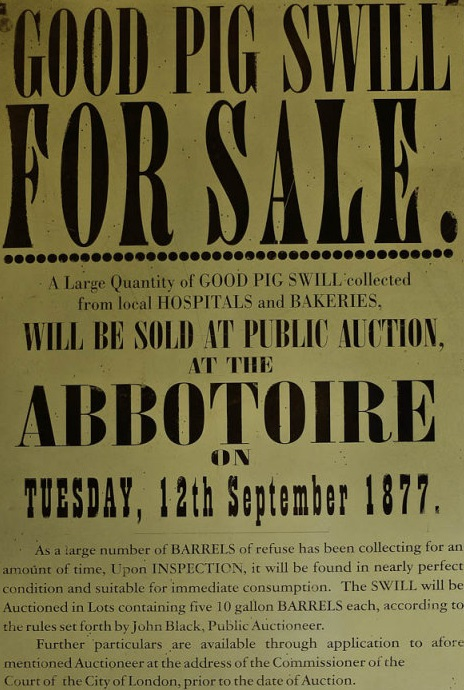
Poster for pig swill for auction sale, London, 1877

Swill is liquid (or partially liquid) food for animals.

The term can also be used as a derogatory label for any drink meant for human ingestion, perceived as unpalatable or nearly so.

== Pig swill ==
Pig swill, hog swill, hogwash, or garbage feeding is kitchen refuse used to feed pigs.

Historically, pig farmers arranged collection of swill, e.g. by means of swill bins. The grease was skimmed off the swill tanks and sold for further processing, while the remaining swill was processed into pig food.

During World War II, a collection of pig swill was a nationwide campaign in Great Britain.

During the 2001 United Kingdom foot-and-mouth outbreak, it was thought that unprocessed pig swill was a key link in the chain of the infection, and it was banned in Great Britain. In 2003, the ban was expanded to the whole European Union.

Some have argued for a return to feeding swill to pigs. The cited claims are to reduce pig feed costs and agricultural land for pig feed. The method is controversial due to its disease risks and for potential for microplastics to end up in meat. In the United States, 27 states, along with Puerto Rico and the US Virgin Islands, permit swill feeding, for which proper processing and a license is required. Swill feeding is prohibited in 23 states.

== See also ==
- Swill milk scandal
