= Poisoning =

- Hazard Symbol (Pictogram) for Poisonning
- Specialty: Toxicology

Poisoning is the harmful effect which occurs when toxic substances are introduced into the body. The term "poisoning" is a derivative of poison, a term describing any chemical substance that may harm or kill a living organism upon ingestion. Poisoning can be brought on by swallowing, inhaling, injecting or absorbing toxins through the skin. Toxicology is the practice and study of symptoms, mechanisms, diagnoses, and treatments correlated to poisoning.

== Levels of exposure ==
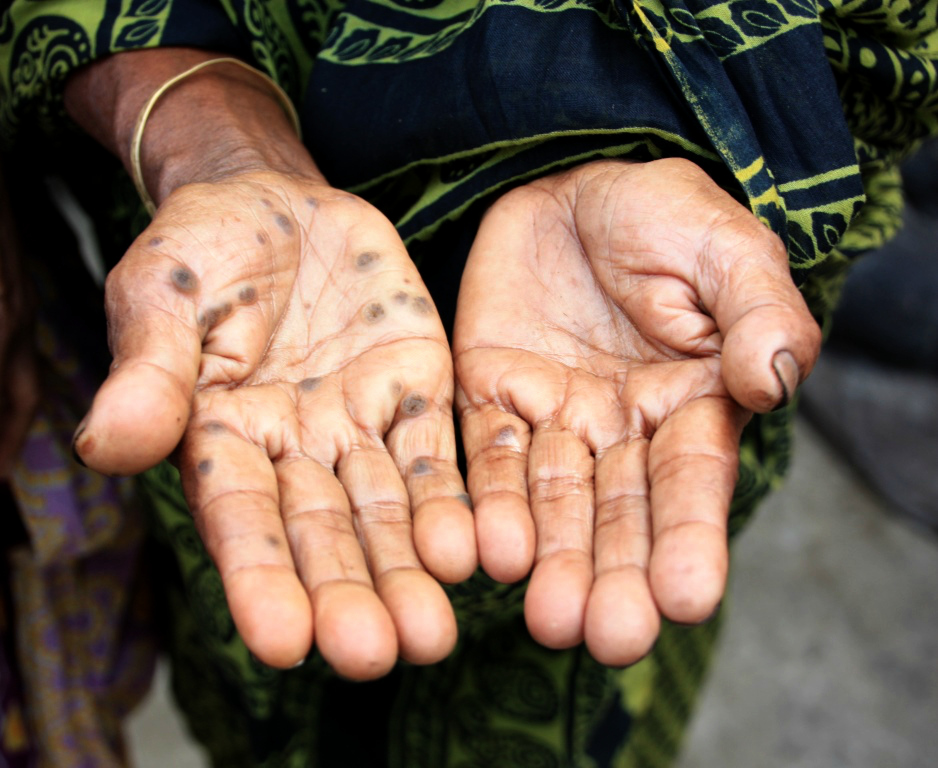
Symptoms of arsenic poisoning

When a poison is introduced to a living organism, the symptoms that follow successful contact develop in close relation to the degree of exposure.

=== Acute exposure ===
Acute toxicity or poisoning consists of a living organism being harmfully exposed to poison once or more times during a brief period, with symptoms manifesting within 14 days since administration.

=== Chronic exposure ===
Chronic toxicity or poisoning involves a living organism being exposed to a toxin on multiple instances over an extended period of time, whereas the symptoms either develop gradually or after a protracted latent period. Chronic poisoning most commonly occurs following exposure to poisons that bioaccumulate, or are biomagnified, such as mercury, gadolinium, and lead.

== Methods ==
Death rate from poisoning Map

=== Accidental ===
In 2020, America's Poison Centers' NPDS (National Poison Data System) report determined that 76.9% of recorded toxin exposures were accidental, with the rest of the statistics either being deliberate or unexpected. A large portion of these accidental incidents occurred due to mistakenly taking the incorrect medicine, or doubling one's dose by mistake.

=== Industry and warfare ===
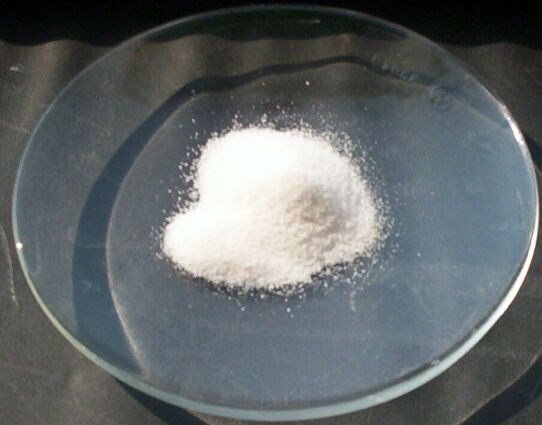
Arsenic trioxide is a white, crystalline powder that closely resembles sugar. The 1858 Bradford sweets poisoning incident happened because it was mistaken for a sugar substitute ("daff").

Nerve gases are synthetic substances used in industry or warfare that are specifically engineered to harm living organisms. They may paralyze a person in a matter of seconds or cease organ function, quickly resulting in death. They are considered to be biologically derived neurotoxins, which are a genre of toxic agents that act specifically against the nervous system. Inhaled or ingested cyanide (or Zyklon B) was used as a method of execution in gas chambers. This method of poisoning instantly starved the body of energy by inhibiting the enzymes in mitochondria that produce ATP. Intravenous injection of an unnaturally high concentration of potassium chloride, such as in the execution of prisoners in parts of the United States, quickly stops the heart by eliminating the cell potential necessary for muscle contraction.

=== Pesticides ===
Most biocides, including pesticides, are created to act as poisons to target organisms. Although acute or less observable chronic poisoning can also occur in non-target organisms (secondary poisoning), including the humans who apply the biocides and other beneficial organisms. For example, the herbicide 2,4-D imitates the action of a plant hormone, which makes its lethal toxicity specific to plants. Indeed, 2,4-D is not a poison, but is classified as harmful.

=== Toxication ===
Many substances regarded as poisons are toxic only indirectly through toxication. An example is "wood alcohol" or methanol, which is not poisonous itself but is chemically converted to toxic formaldehyde and formic acid once it reaches the liver. Many drug molecules are made toxic in the liver, and the genetic variability of certain liver enzymes makes the toxicity of many compounds differ between people.

== Prevention ==
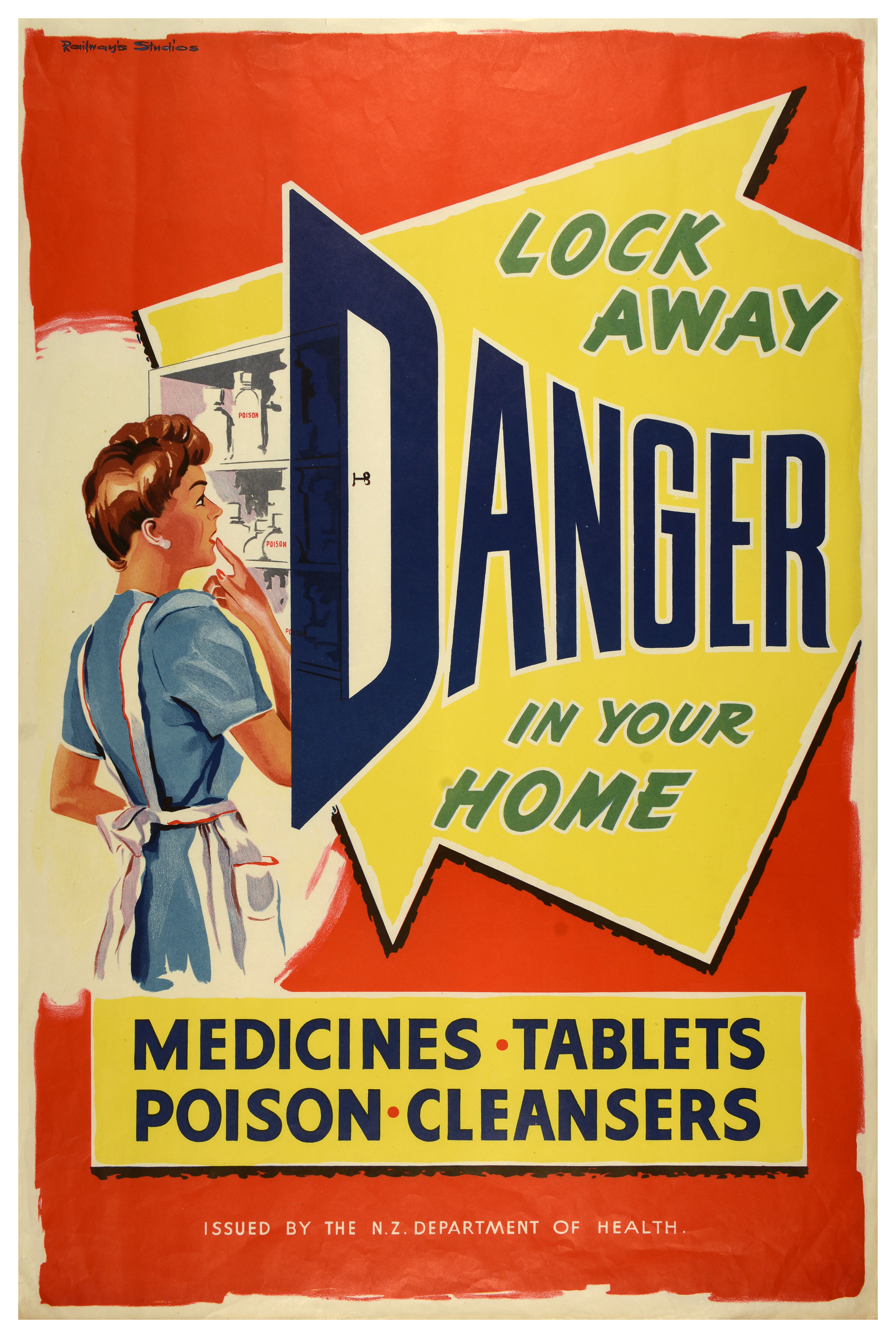
Poisoning prevention poster from New Zealand

As mandated in GHS, various safety-orientated government agencies from around the globe have put into place the usage of pictograms when labeling toxic substances. The hazard symbol which labels a substance as capable of poisoning depicts the imagery of a human skull in front of two bones crossing one another.

GHS precautionary statements, which advise users to exercise caution or be aware of the substance's potentially dangerous features, are added to a legal toxins' labelling. Toxic substances can also come with instructions on how to handle the product, what compounds to avoid mixing the product with, and how to treat a victim at risk of poisoning who has come in contact with the product.

Various poison control centers are also available to assist in diagnosing, managing, and preventing possible incidents of poisoning. Many are accessible through phone calls or official websites.

== Treatment ==
Seeking medical attention is strongly advised if someone is thought to have been exposed to or consumed a poison, mainly from a nearby poison control centre. It is advised to provide medical personnel with information regarding the poisoning, the patient's age, weight, and any other drugs they may be taking in addition to the symptoms of the illness. Try to determine what was ingested, the amount and how long since the person was exposed to it. If possible, have on hand the pill bottle, medication package or other suspect container.

The treatment will depend on the substance to which the patient is exposed. Depending on the type of poisoning, some first aid measures may help. Treatments include activated charcoal, induction of vomiting, and dilution or neutralizing of the poison.

== See also ==
- EPA list of extremely hazardous substances
- List of poisonous plants
- List of types of poison
- Lists of poisonings
- Opioid epidemic in the United States
- Suicide by poisoning
