= C12H20O6 =

The molecular formula C_{12}H_{20}O_{6} (molar mass: 260.286 g/mol) refers to a number of compounds, including:

- Glycerol triglycidyl ether
- Tripropionin
