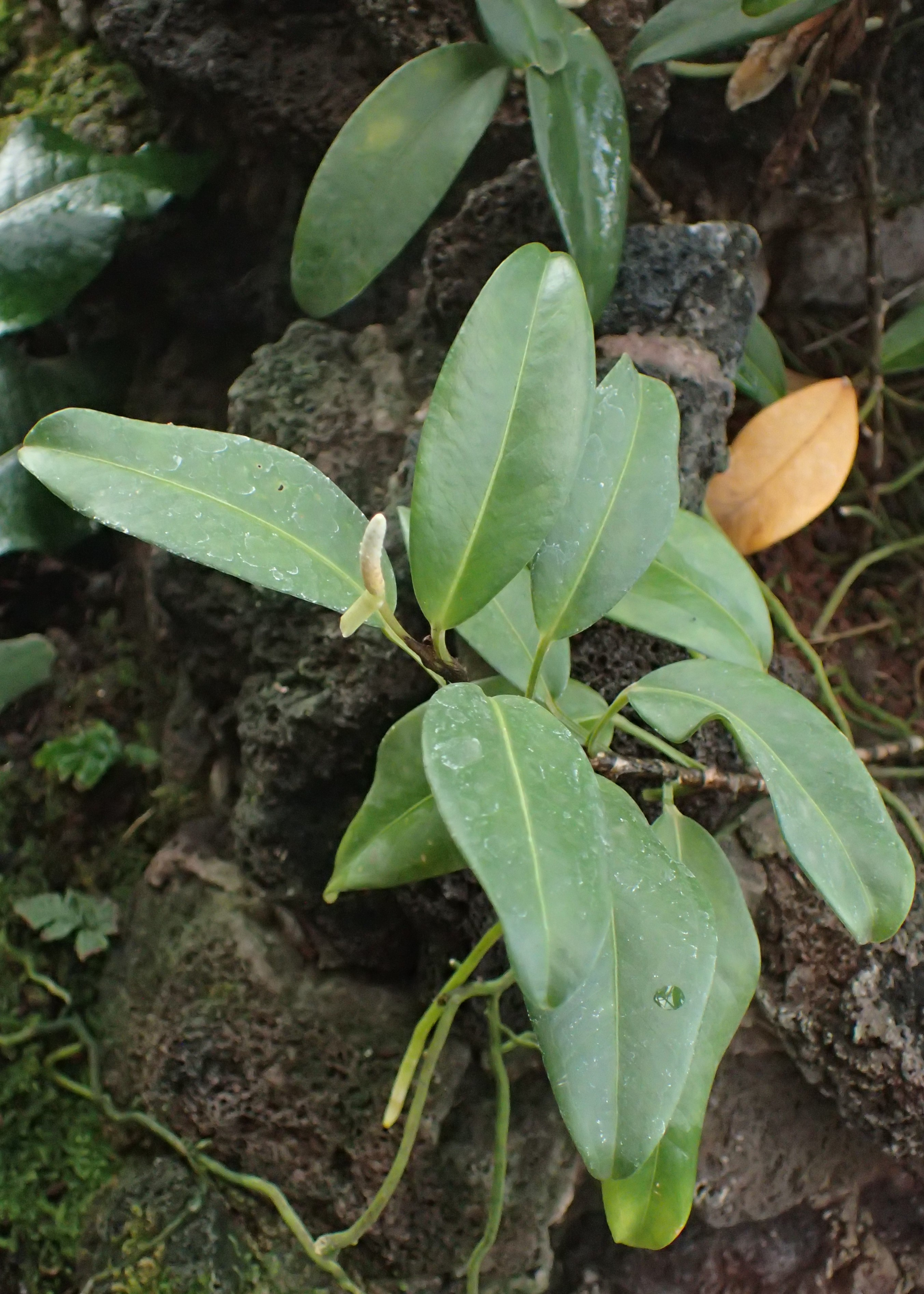
- A. scandens in the Berlin Botanical Garden and Botanical Museum
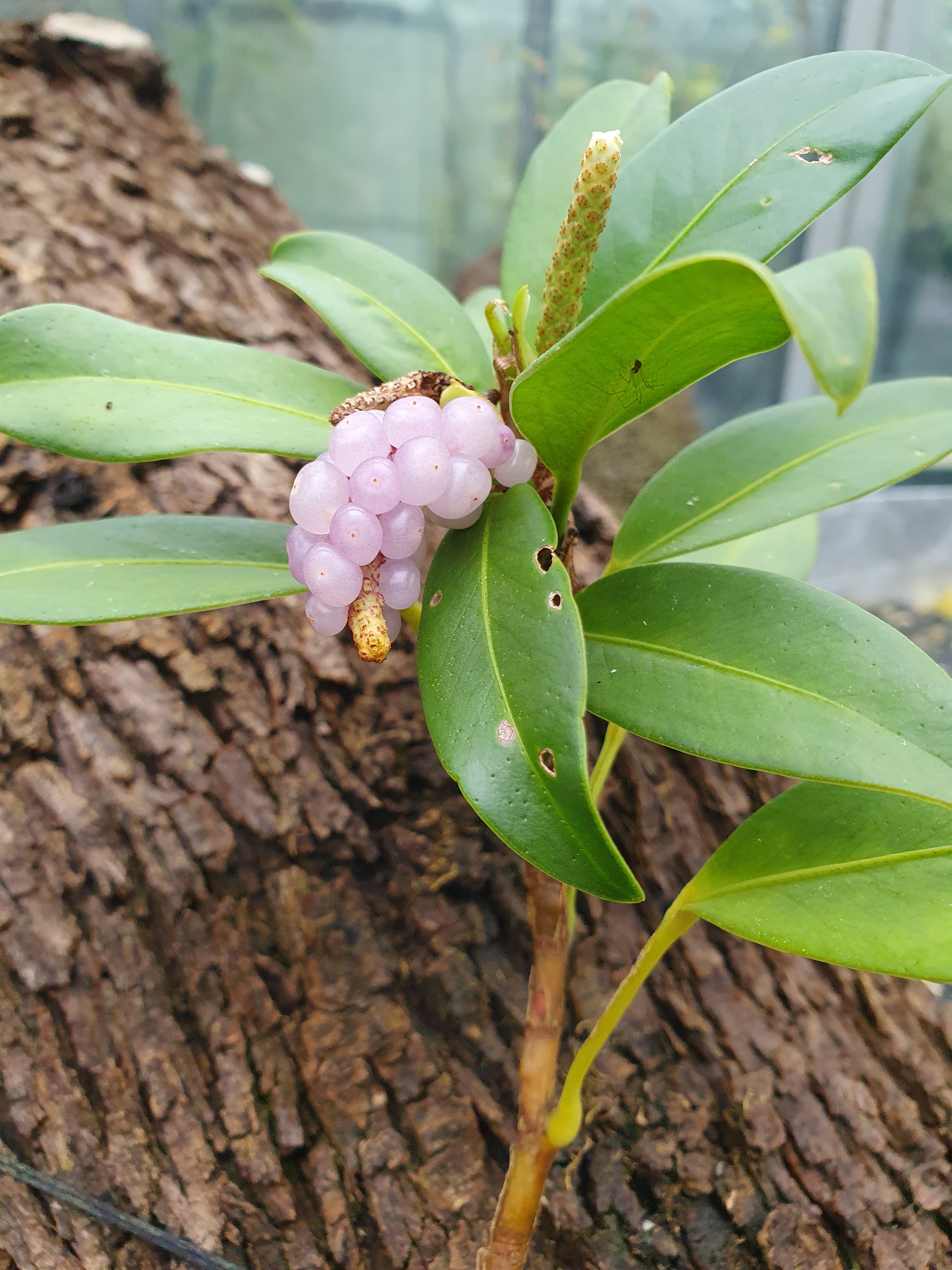
- Anthurium scandens (Aubl.) Engl. cultivated in the Botanical Garden of the University of Regensburg

Scientific classification
- Kingdom: Plantae
- Clade: Tracheophytes
- Clade: Angiosperms
- Clade: Monocots
- Order: Alismatales
- Family: Araceae
- Genus: Anthurium
- Species: A. scandens

Binomial name
- Anthurium scandens (Aubl.) Engl.

Synonyms
- Dracontium scandens Aubl.

= Anthurium scandens =

Species of plant

Anthurium scandens is a species of plant in the genus Anthurium. Native from Mexico to Southeast Brazil, it is the most widely distributed species of Anthurium in the Americas, and also extends to the Caribbean including Haiti, Puerto Rico, Jamaica, and other nations.

An epiphyte with green, elliptical foliage and white berries, its botanical name refers to its scandent (i.e. climbing) growth habit. It is the most common and variable species in the genus with a number of subspecies across its range. It is most often confused with Anthurium trinerve, but can be distinguished by the fact that its spathe is reflexed when flowering, whereas on A. trinerve it stays erect. In some areas the plant is used medicinally as folk medicine from a tincture prepared from its roots.
