= Tincture =

Herbal liquid

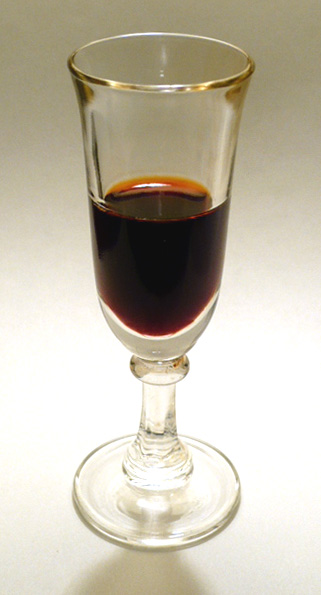
A tincture prepared from white willow bark and ethanol, containing salicin (from which salicylic acid-based products like aspirin are derived)

A tincture is typically an extract of plant or animal material dissolved in ethanol (ethyl alcohol). Solvent concentrations of 25–60% are common, but may run as high as 90%. In chemistry, a tincture is a solution that has ethanol as the sole solvent. In herbal medicine, alcoholic tinctures are made with various ethanol concentrations, which should be at least 20% alcohol for preservation purposes.

Other solvents for producing tinctures include vinegar, glycerol (also called glycerine), diethyl ether and propylene glycol, not all of which can be used for internal consumption. Ethanol has the advantage of being an excellent solvent for both acidic and basic (alkaline) constituents. A tincture using glycerine is called a glycerite. Glycerine is generally a poorer solvent than ethanol. Vinegar, being acidic, is a better solvent for obtaining alkaloids but a poorer solvent for acidic components. For individuals who choose not to ingest alcohol, non-alcoholic extracts offer an alternative for preparations meant to be taken internally.

Low volatility substances such as iodine and mercurochrome can also be turned into tinctures.

== Characteristics ==
Tinctures are often made of a combination of ethyl alcohol and water as solvents, each dissolving constituents the other is unable to, or weaker at. Varying their proportions can also produce different levels of constituents in the final extraction. As an antimicrobial, alcohol also acts as a preservative.

A downside of using alcohol as a solvent is that ethanol has a tendency to denature some organic compounds, reducing or destroying their effectiveness. This tendency can also have undesirable effects when extracting botanical constituents, such as polysaccharides. Certain other constituents, common among them proteins, can become irreversibly denatured, or "pickled" by the alcohol. Alcohol can also have damaging effects on some aromatic compounds.

Ether and propylene glycol based tinctures are not suitable for internal consumption, although they are used in preparations for external use, such as personal care creams and ointments.

== Examples ==
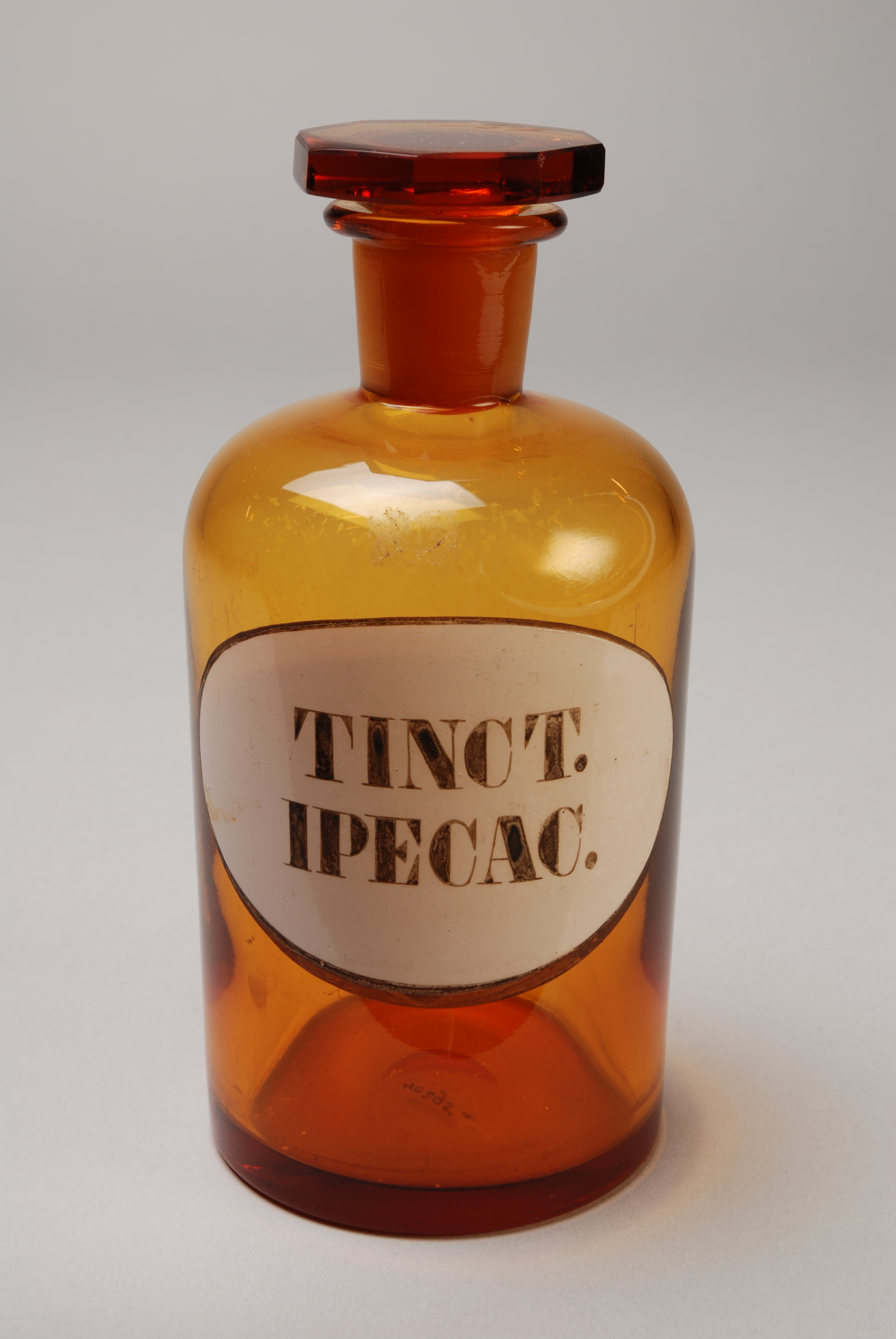
Bottle for holding ipecac tincture

Some examples that were formerly common in medicine include:

- Tincture of benzoin
- Tincture of cannabis
- Tincture of cantharides
- Tincture of castoreum
- Tincture of ferric citrochloride, a chelate of citric acid and Iron(III) chloride
- Tincture of green soap, which classically contains lavender oil
- Tincture of guaiac gum
- Tincture of iodine
- Tincture of opium (laudanum)
  - Camphorated tincture of opium (paregoric)
- Tincture of pennyroyal
- Warburg's tincture ("Tinctura Antiperiodica" or "Antiperiodic Tincture", a 19th-century antipyretic)

Examples of spirits include:

- Spirit of ammonia (spirits of hartshorn)
- Spirit of camphor
- Spirit of ether, a solution of diethyl ether in alcohol
- "Spirit of Mindererus", ammonium acetate in alcohol
- "Spirit of nitre" is not a spirit in this sense, but an old name for nitric acid (but "sweet spirit of nitre" was ethyl nitrite)
- Similarly "spirit(s) of salt" actually meant hydrochloric acid. The concentrated, fuming, 35% acid is still sold under this name in the UK, for use as a drain-cleaning fluid.
- "Spirit of vinegar" is an antiquated term for glacial acetic acid
- "Spirit of vitriol" is an antiquated term for sulfuric acid
- "Spirit of wine" or "spirits of wine" is an old term for alcohol (especially food grade alcohol derived from the distillation of wine)
- "Spirit of wood" referred to methanol, often derived from the destructive distillation of wood

== See also ==
- Nalewka, traditional Polish category of alcoholic tincture.
- Infusion, water or oil based extract with similar historical uses to a tincture.
- Elixir, pharmaceutical preparation containing an active ingredient that is dissolved in a solution containing some percentage of ethyl alcohol.
- Extract
- Klosterfrau Melissengeist
- Spagyric, fermentation, distillation, and extraction of mineral components from the ash residue of calcinated plants.
- Topical, categorization of topical skin preparation options
- Theriac
