= Glycerol (data page) =

Chemical data page

This page provides supplementary chemical data on glycerol.

== Material Safety Data Sheet ==
The handling of this chemical may incur notable safety precautions. It is highly recommended that you seek the Material Safety Datasheet (MSDS) for this chemical from a reliable source and follow its directions.

== Structure and properties ==
Structure and properties
Index of refraction, n_{D}	1.4729 at 20 °C
Abbe number	?
Dielectric constant, ε_{r}	42.5 ε_{0} at 25 °C
Bond strength	?
Bond length	?
Bond angle	?
Magnetic susceptibility	?
Surface tension	63.4 mN/m at 20 °C; 58.6 mN/m at 90 °C; 51.9 mN/m at 150 °C
Viscosity	1.412 Pa·s at 20 °C

== Thermodynamic properties ==
Phase behavior
Triple point	291.8 K (18.7 °C), ~99500 Pa
Critical point	850 K (577 °C), 7500 kPa
Std enthalpy change of fusion, Δ_{fus}H^{~~o~~}	18.28 kJ/mol
Std entropy change of fusion, Δ_{fus}S^{~~o~~}	62.7 J/(mol·K)
Std enthalpy change of vaporization, Δ_{vap}H^{~~o~~}	91.7 kJ/mol
Std entropy change of vaporization, Δ_{vap}S^{~~o~~}	201 J/(mol·K)
Solid properties
Std enthalpy change of formation, Δ_{f}H^{~~o~~}_{solid}	? kJ/mol
Standard molar entropy, S^{~~o~~}_{solid}	37.87 J/(mol K)
Heat capacity, c_{p}	150. J/(mol K) 6 °C - 11 °C
Liquid properties
Std enthalpy change of formation, Δ_{f}H^{~~o~~}_{liquid}	–669.6 kJ/mol
Standard molar entropy, S^{~~o~~}_{liquid}	206.3 J/(mol K)
Enthalpy of combustion, Δ_{c}H^{~~o~~}	–1654.3 kJ/mol
Heat capacity, c_{p}	221.9 J/(mol K) at 25 °C
Gas properties
Std enthalpy change of formation, Δ_{f}H^{~~o~~}_{gas}	–577.9 kJ/mol
Standard molar entropy, S^{~~o~~}_{gas}	? J/(mol K)
Heat capacity, c_{p}	? J/(mol K)

== Vapor pressure of liquid ==
P in mm Hg	1	10	40	100	400	760
T in °C	125.5	167.2	198.0	220.1	263.0	290.0

Table data obtained from CRC Handbook of Chemistry and Physics, 44th ed.

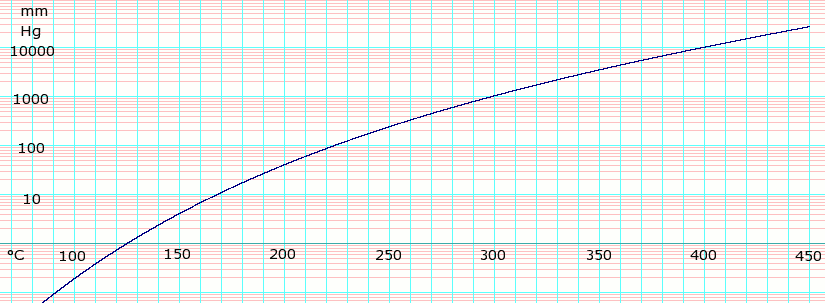

log_{e} of Glycerol vapor pressure. Uses formula: $\scriptstyle \log_e P_{kPa} =$$\scriptstyle A \times ln(T) + B/T + C + D \times T^2$ with coefficients A=-2.125867E+01, B=-1.672626E+04, C=1.655099E+02, and D=1.100480E-05 obtained from CHERIC

== Freezing point of aqueous solutions ==
% glycerol by weight	10	20	30	40	50	60	70	80	90	100
Freezing point °C	–1.6	–4.8	–9.5	–15.5	–22.0	–33.6	–37.8	–19.2	–1.6	17.0
Specific gravity d^{15°}	1.02415	1.04935	1.07560	1.10255	1.12985	1.15770	1.18540	1.21290	1.23950	1.26557

Table data obtained from Lange's Handbook of Chemistry, 10th ed. Specific gravity is at 15 °C, referenced to water at 15 °C.

See details on: Freezing Points of Glycerine-Water Solutions Dow Chemical or Freezing Points of Glycerol and Its Aqueous Solutions.

== Distillation data ==
Vapor-liquid Equilibrium of Glycerol/water; P = 760 mmHg
BP Temp. °C	% by mole water
BP Temp. °C	liquid	vapor
278.8	2.75	93.15
247.0	4.67	94.73
224.0	6.90	95.63
219.2	7.67	97.43
210.0	9.01	97.83
202.5	10.31	97.24
196.5	11.59	98.39
175.2	17.56	98.99
149.3	30.04	99.64
137.2	38.47	99.76
136.8	38.95	98.78
131.8	43.58	99.76
121.5	56.33	99.84
112.8	70.68	99.93
111.3	73.86	99.94
106.3	84.42	99.96

== Spectral data ==
UV-Vis
λ_{max}	? nm
Extinction coefficient, ε	?
IR
Major absorption bands	? cm^{−1}
NMR
Proton NMR
Carbon-13 NMR
Other NMR data
MS
Masses of main fragments

This box:
- Except where noted otherwise, data relate to Standard temperature and pressure.
- Reliability of data general note.
