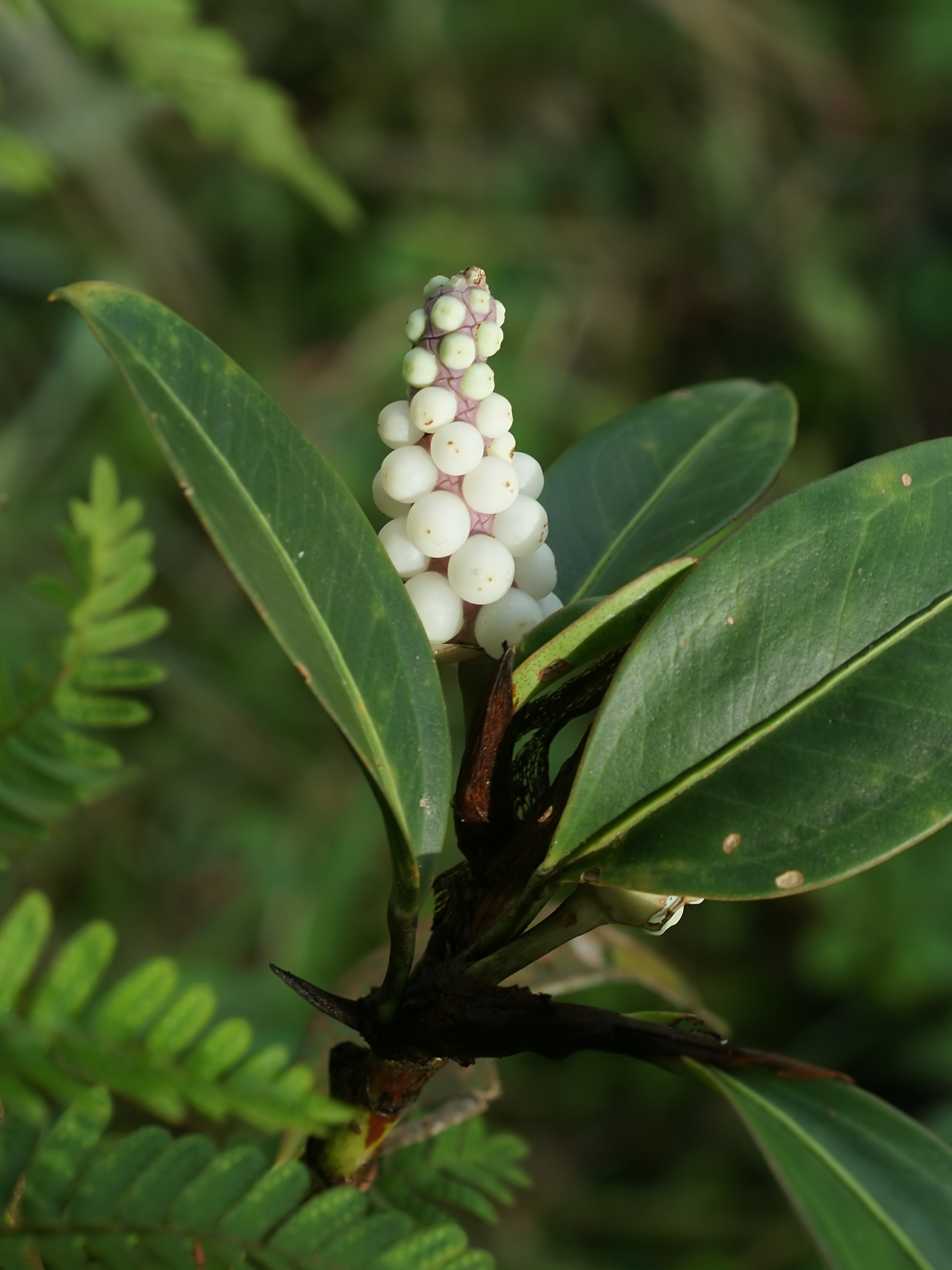
- A. obtusum in Costa Rica, fruiting

Scientific classification
- Kingdom: Plantae
- Clade: Tracheophytes
- Clade: Angiosperms
- Clade: Monocots
- Order: Alismatales
- Family: Araceae
- Genus: Anthurium
- Species: A. obtusum

Binomial name
- Anthurium obtusum Sod(Engl.) Grayumiro

Synonyms
- Anthurium trinerve var. obtusum

= Anthurium obtusum =

Species of plant

Anthurium obtusum is a species of plant in the genus Anthurium widely distributed in Central and South America, from Belize to Bolivia. The species was originally described as Anthurium trinerve by Adolf Engler and then in 1997, reclassified. The species is easily confused with Anthurium scandens, but can be distinguished by its terrestrial growth habit and a white spathe which stays erect rather than reflexed.

== Subspecies ==
A. obtusum has two accepted subspecies:

- Anthurium obtusum subsp. obtusum the more common subspecies
- Anthurium obtusum subsp. puntarenense native to Costa Rica
