= Glycerite =

A traditional glycerite is a fluid extract of an herb or other medicinal substance made using glycerin as the majority of the fluid extraction medium.

== Definition ==
According to King's American Dispensatory (1898), glycerite is:

Glycerita.—Glycerites. By this class of preparations is generally understood solutions of medicinal substances in glycerin, although in certain instances the various Pharmacopoeias deviate to an extent. The term Glycerita as here applied to fluid glycerines, or solutions of agents in glycerin, is preferable to the ordinary names, "glyceroles," "glycerates," or "glycemates," etc., and includes all fluid preparations of the kind referred to, whether for internal administration or local application.

Glycerites may consist of either vegetable source glycerin, animal source glycerin or a combination of the two. In the case of liquid herbal products (a segment of the dietary supplements industry), the general rule is to utilize vegetable glycerin only, while nutraceuticals (another segment of the dietary supplements industry) might use a combination of both vegetable and animal source derived glycerin.

Alcohol-free (as opposed to alcohol-removed) glycerite products, in which alcohol is never used or added at any time, are preferred by those desiring or requiring that no alcohol be used in making products or added thereafter. The reasons are typically for personal or religious beliefs.

Muslims for instance, represent the largest population requiring an alcohol-free standard. Halal, the Islamic dietary law, lists alcohol as one of the 'explicitly forbidden substances' (called Haram) in which anything made with and/or at any time containing alcohol is forbidden. USP grade vegetable glycerin is acceptable for Halal certifying and in some instances a Halal standard may (but not always) accept Kosher certified USP Grade vegetable glycerin as meeting Halal standards (i.e. to be Halal 'compliant'). Where the issue of Halal Alcohol-Free versus Haram Alcohol-Removed glycerites is concerned, even though U.S. FDA Title 21 rules forbid referring to or labeling a product as being 'Alcohol-Free' that has at any time come into contact with alcohol, the Islamic community has taken the stance that products listed as alcohol-free often does not always mean "Alcohol-Free" as defined by Halal standards or U.S. FDA Title 21 rules, since many products listed as alcohol-free may in fact have been made using alcohol as an ingredient after which the alcohol is removed, which would still make any such products Haram by Islamic Dietary Law and in breach of U.S. FDA Title 21 labeling rules. The Islamic community is therefore encouraged to first ascertain whether a botanical glycerite is actually Halal 'Alcohol-Free' (e.g. Halal Certified or Halal compliant) or is Haram 'Alcohol-Removed' with glycerin thereafter added.
