= Glycerol triglycidyl ether =

Names
- Other names Triglycidylglycerol; triglycidyl glycerol

Identifiers
CAS Number	13236-02-7
3D model (JSmol)	Interactive image
ChemSpider	24031
ECHA InfoCard	100.032.905
EC Number	236-211-1
PubChem CID	25795
UNII	0KVT2Q7Z17
CompTox Dashboard (EPA)	DTXSID00884584
- InChI: InChI=1S/C12H20O6/c1(13-3-10-5-16-10)9(15-7-12-8-18-12)2-14-4-11-6-17-11/h9-12H,1-8H2 Key: SYEWHONLFGZGLK-UHFFFAOYSA-N
- SMILES: C1C(O1)COCC(COCC2CO2)OCC3CO3

Properties
Chemical formula	C_{12}H_{20}O_{6}
Molar mass	260.286 g·mol^{−1}
- Except where otherwise noted, data are given for materials in their standard state (at 25 °C [77 °F], 100 kPa). Infobox references

Glycerol triglycidyl ether (triglycidyl glycerol) is an aliphatic organic chemical in the glycidyl ether family. It has the formula C_{12}H_{20}O_{6}. The CAS number is 13236–02–7. The IUPAC name is 2-[1,3-bis(oxiran-2-ylmethoxy)propan-2-yloxymethyl]oxirane. A key use is as a modifier for epoxy resins as a reactive diluent.

== Alternative names ==
There are a variety of recognized alternate names.

- Triglycidylglycerol
- 1,2,3-Tris(2,3-epoxypropoxy)propane
- Glycerine triglycidyl ether
- Glycerol tris(2,3-epoxypropyl) ether
- 2-[1,3-bis(oxiran-2-ylmethoxy)propan-2-yloxymethyl]oxirane
- Propane, 1,2,3-tris(2,3-epoxypropoxy)-
- Glycerol 1,2,3-triglycidyl ether

== Manufacture ==
Glycerine and epichlorohydrin are reacted with a Lewis acid catalyst to form a halohydrin. The next step is dehydrochlorination with sodium hydroxide. This forms the triglycidyl ether.

== Uses ==
As the molecule has 3 oxirane functionalities, it is a reactive modifier and viscosity reduction agent of epoxy resins. These reactive diluent modified epoxy resins may then be further formulated into CASE applications: Coatings, Adhesives, Sealants, and Elastomers. The use of the diluent does effect mechanical properties and microstructure of epoxy resins. Its use in photochemical applications has also been extensively used and studied. Uses in modern battery technology have also been researched. The molecule maybe further reacted to produce materials such as surfactants.
