= Protein adulteration in China =

Food contamination events in China

In China the adulteration and contamination of food and feed ingredients with inexpensive melamine and other compounds, such as cyanuric acid, ammeline and ammelide, was a common practice. These adulterants can be used to inflate the apparent protein content of products, so that inexpensive ingredients can pass for more expensive, concentrated proteins. Melamine by itself has not been thought to be toxic to animals or humans except possibly in very high concentrations, but the combination of melamine and cyanuric acid has been implicated in kidney failure. Reports that cyanuric acid may be an independently and potentially widely used adulterant in China have heightened concerns for animal and human health.

Chinese protein export contamination was first identified after the recall of brands of cat and dog food in the 2007 pet food recalls. The recalls in North America, Europe and South Africa came in response to reports of kidney failure in pets. Chinese companies sold products claimed to be wheat gluten, rice protein or corn gluten, but which proved to be wheat flour adulterated with melamine, cyanuric acid, and other contaminants. The Chinese government was slow to respond, denying vegetable protein was exported from China and refusing to allow foreign food safety investigators to enter China. Ultimately, the Chinese government acknowledged that contamination had occurred and arrested the managers of two protein manufacturers identified and took other measures to improve food safety and product quality.

Reports of widespread adulteration of Chinese animal feed with melamine have raised the issue of melamine contamination in the human food supply both in China and abroad. In April 2007, the U.S. Food and Drug Administration (FDA) subjected all vegetable proteins imported from China, intended for human or animal consumption, to detention without physical examination, including: wheat gluten, rice gluten, rice protein, rice protein concentrate, corn gluten, corn gluten meal, corn by-products, soy protein, soy gluten, proteins (includes amino acids and protein hydrolysates), and mung bean protein. Officials from the FDA and U.S. Department of Agriculture said that between 2.5 and 3 million Americans had consumed chickens that had consumed feed containing contaminated vegetable protein from China. Reports that melamine has been added as a binder in animal feed manufactured in North America raised the possibility that harmful melamine contamination might not be limited to China.

In 2008, Sanlu Group had to recall baby formula because it was contaminated with melamine. Around 294,000 babies in China became ill after drinking the milk; at least six died. As of July 2010, Chinese authorities were still reporting some seizures of melamine-contaminated dairy product in some provinces, though it was unclear whether these new contaminations constituted wholly new adulterations or were the result of illegal reuse of material from the 2008 adulterations.

== History ==
The contaminated vegetable proteins were imported from China in 2006 and early 2007 and used as pet food ingredients. The process of identifying and accounting for the source of the contamination and for how the contaminant causes sickness was ongoing.

The first recalls were announced by Menu Foods late on Friday, 16 March 2007 for cat and dog food products in the United States. By 30 March the United States began to ban imports of wheat gluten from China. The Chinese government responded on 4 April by categorically denying any connection to the North American food poisonings refusing to allow inspection of facilities suspected of producing contaminated products.

However, on 6 April 2007, the Chinese government told the Associated Press they would investigate the source of the wheat gluten and by 23 April China gave permission to FDA investigators to enter the country. On 25 April Chinese authorities began to shut down and destroy the implicated factories and detain their managers. The following day, China's Foreign Ministry said it had banned the use of melamine in food products, admitting that products containing melamine had cleared customs while continuing to dispute the role of melamine in causing pet deaths. China also vowed to cooperate with U.S. investigators to find the "real cause" of pet deaths.

The United States Senate held an oversight hearing on the matter by 12 April. The economic impact on the pet food market has been extensive, with Menu Foods losing roughly US$30 million alone from the recall.

On 24 April 2007, for the first time, FDA officials said that melamine had been detected in feed given to animals raised for human consumption within the United States.

As of 7 May 2007, United States food safety officials stated: "There is very low risk to human health from consuming meat from hogs and chickens known to have been fed animal feed supplemented with pet food scraps that contained melamine and melamine-related compounds"

== Investigations ==
In the 2007 outbreak, as all three pet food ingredients containing melamine had been imported from China, investigators focused their inquiries there. Another concern was raised by allegations that one contract manufacturer of pet food had included contaminated ingredients from China without the knowledge or approval of the pet food marketers. Melamine had also been purposely added as a binder to fish feed manufactured in the United States from ingredients produced in Ohio. This adulteration has not been linked to any illness. The FDA issued a Warning Letter to Tembec, the manufacturer of the adulterated binding ingredients. In response, Tembec declared that, in addition to completing the recall of all products containing the adulterated binding ingredients, it would "discontinue manufacturing and marketing of [the products] as aquatic feed binder. Tembec's aquatic feed binder products were also used by another US company, Uniscope, to produce a binder (XtraBond) for livestock feeds. This binder and the feeds made from it were not recalled, nor was the meat of the livestock fed on these feeds. No fish or fish products were recalled as a result of having been raised on the adulterated feeds.

In 2008, investigation of kidney problems in Chinese infants focused on domestic dairy suppliers in China.

=== Melamine production and use in China ===
Melamine is commonly produced from urea, mainly by either catalyzed gas-phase production or high pressure liquid-phase production, and is soluble in water. Melamine is used combined with formaldehyde to produce melamine resin, a very durable thermosetting plastic, and melamine foam, a polymeric cleaning product. The end products include counter-tops, fabrics, glues and flame retardants. Occasionally, melamine-formaldehyde resin is added to gluten for non-food purposes, such as adhesives or fabric printing.

Melamine is also a byproduct of several pesticides, including cyromazine. The Food Safety and Inspection Service (FSIS) of the United States Department of Agriculture (USDA) provides a test method for analyzing cyromazine and melamine in animal tissues in its Chemistry Laboratory Guidebook which "contains test methods used by FSIS Laboratories to support the Agency's inspection program, ensuring that meat, poultry, and egg products are safe, wholesome and accurately labeled." In 1999, in a proposed rule published in the Federal Register regarding cyromazine residue, the United States Environmental Protection Agency (EPA) proposed "remov[ing] melamine, a metabolite of cyromazine from the tolerance expression since it is no longer considered a residue of concern."

Melamine production in China has also been reported as using coal as raw material. This production has been described as also producing "melamine scrap" which is not "pure melamine but impure melamine scrap that is sold more cheaply as the waste product after melamine is produced by chemical and fertilizer factories here." Shandong Mingshui Great Chemical Group, the company reported by The New York Times as producing melamine from coal, produces and sells both urea and melamine but does not list melamine resin as a product. Melamine production in China has increased greatly in recent years and was described as in "serious surplus" in 2006. In the United States Geological Survey 2004 Minerals Survey Yearbook, in a report on worldwide nitrogen production, the author stated that "China continued to plan and construct new ammonia and urea plants using coal gasification technology."

The off-gas in production contains large amounts of ammonia (see melamine synthesis). Therefore, melamine production is often integrated into urea production which uses ammonia as feedstock. Crystallization and washing of melamine generates a considerable amount of waste water, which is a pollutant if discharged directly into the environment. The waste water may be concentrated into a solid (1.5-5% of the weight) for easier disposal. The solid may contain approximately 70% melamine, 23% oxytriazines (ammeline, ammelide and cyanuric acid), 0.7% polycondensates (melem, melam and melon).

In January 2009, China's Ministry of Industry and Information Technology promulgated draft production permit rules aiming to stem a melamine production glut. Melamine had been widely sold, including over the Internet, for around 10,000 yuan ($1,500) a tonne. The ministry also aimed to shrink the number of melamine producers by setting minimum production levels and strengthening controls on ingredients and waste.

=== Suspicion of contamination in China ===
Melamine manufacturing and the chemical processes in which melamine are used are completely unrelated to the manufacture or processing of food products such as wheat gluten. On 9 April the FDA stated that there is a "distinct possibility" that the food was intentionally contaminated. According to Senator Richard J. Durbin, one theory that investigators are exploring is whether melamine was added to fraudulently increase the measured protein content, which determines the value of the product. Some analysis methods for determining protein content actually measure the amount of nitrogen present, on the assumption that only protein in the sample contributes significantly to its nitrogen content. Melamine contains a very high proportion of nitrogen. According to Liu Laiting, a Chinese professor of animal sciences, melamine is also hard to detect in ordinary tests.

==== Glutens ====
Xuzhou Anying Biologic Technology Development Company (徐州安营生物技术开发有限公司), an agricultural products company based in Xuzhou, Jiangsu, China, which U.S. officials believe was the source of the melamine-contaminated gluten, are maintaining innocence and assert that they are cooperating with officials. The general manager for Xuzhou Anying has denied that his company exported goods and says that they are researching who might have exported their product. They note that per Chinese law, all exported wheat gluten is tested and that they were simply a middle man for local producers. However, a truck driver who has carried goods for Xuzhou Anying contradicted this, saying "they have a factory that makes wheat gluten." Officials in the USDA and FDA believe that Xuzhou Anying labeled its wheat gluten as "nonfood" and exported through a third party, Suzhou Textiles Silk Light & Industrial Products. The nonfood designation would allow the gluten to be shipped without inspection, however a spokesman for Suzhou Textiles has denied that the company exported any wheat gluten.

There is evidence that Xuzhou Anying, despite being a food ingredient supplier, has sought out large quantities of melamine in the past. The New York Times has reported that as recently as 29 March 2007, representatives of Xuzhou Anying wrote, "Our company buys large quantities of melamine scrap" on a message board for the trading of industrial materials. Melamine may have been added to enhance the apparent protein content of the wheat gluten. However, the importer of the wheat gluten, ChemNutra, claims that they received from Xuzhou Anying results of analyses showing "no impurities or contamination." It has not yet been determined whether Xuzhou Anying products other than wheat gluten have been shipped to North America.

The second Chinese supplier involved in shipping melamine-contaminated food ingredients, Binzhou Futian Biology Technology, has been working with importer Wilbur-Ellis since July 2006. Binzhou Futian supplies soy, corn and other proteins to the United States, Europe and Southeast Asia. Binzhou typically ships rice protein concentrate in white bags but on 11 April one bag was pink and had the word "melamine" stenciled on it. Binzhou explained to Wilbur-Ellis that the original bag had broken and a mislabeled, but new, bag had been used. The company only supplies food and feed ingredients.

Stephen Sundlof, director of the FDA's Center for Veterinary Medicine, said that melamine turning up in exported Chinese wheat gluten, rice protein concentrate and corn gluten supports theories of intentional adulteration. "That will be one of the theories we will pursue when we get into the plants in China."

On 29 April 2007 and 30 April 2007, the International Herald Tribune and The New York Times reported that some animal feed manufacturers in China admit to having used melamine scrap in animal feed for years. Said Ji Denghui, general manager of the Fujian Sanming Dinghui Chemical Company: “Many companies buy melamine scrap to make animal feed, such as fish feed. I don't know if there’s a regulation on it. Probably not. No law or regulation says 'don’t do it,' so everyone's doing it. The laws in China are like that, aren't they? If there’s no accident, there won’t be any regulation.” Such use of "melamine scrap", described as left over from processing of coal into melamine for use in creating plastic and fertilizer, was described as widespread. Melamine is said to have been chosen in order to inflate crude protein content measures and to avoid tests for other common and illegal ingredients, such as urea.

As of 2 May 2007, officials of the USDA and FDA still do not know who manufactured the contaminated food or where the contamination took place. The Chinese government has said that Xuzhou Anying, for instance, purchased its products from 25 different manufacturers.

On 8 May 2007, The International Herald Tribune reported that three Chinese chemical makers have said that animal feed producers often purchase, or seek to purchase, the chemical, cyanuric acid, from their factories to blend into animal feed to give the false appearance of a higher level of protein, suggesting another potentially dangerous way that melamine and cyanuric acid might combine in protein products.

The same day, FDA officials revealed that the vegetable proteins were not only contaminated, but mislabeled. Both the wheat gluten and rice protein concentrate were actually wheat flour, a much cheaper product from which wheat gluten is extracted. The addition of nitrogen-rich compounds were necessary to make the flour test as if it were protein extract.

==== Dairy ====
On 11 September 2008, fresh reports of massive outbreak of melamine contamination found in China led to recall of infant formula products in China. Some Chinese reports said the manufacturer of the milk products might not have consciously added Melamine to their powdered milk, however they could have used a soy protein substitute to lower production costs, and the source of their soy substitute had melamine added to it. Many Chinese babies had developed kidney stones and other acute kidney problems in recent months across China, investigation led to the discovery of this contaminant. Some people were wondering how much melamine has already entered food products designated for adults without discovery. More worrying are claims reported in China that there are now new chemicals that can be added to food to lower production costs, and yet pass the tests for melamine and other related chemicals. Impact of this incident to dairy industry outside China is beginning to unravel.

By the end of September 2008, the Chinese government said that 22 dairy companies, including Sanlu and export brands like Mengniu and Yili, had produced powdered baby formula that contained traces of melamine. Some dairy farmers interviewed in Hebei Province said it was an open secret that milk was adulterated. Some dairies routinely watered down milk to increase profits, then added other cheap ingredients so the milk could pass a protein test. "Before melamine, the dealers added rice porridge or starch into the milk to artificially boost the protein count, but that method was easily tested as fake, so they switched to melamine,” said Zhao Huibin, a dairy farmer near Shijiazhuang.

Investigators say the adulteration was nothing short of a wholesale re-engineering of milk. Researchers established that workers at Sanlu and at a number of milk-collection depots were diluting milk with water; they added melamine to dupe a test for determining crude protein content. "Adulteration used to be simple. What they did was very high-tech", says Chen Junshi, co-chair of the Sino-U.S. workshop and a risk-assessment specialist at China's Center for Disease Control and Prevention. Investigators subsequently learned that the emulsifier used to suspend melamine also boosted apparent milk-fat content. Sanlu baby formula contained a whopping 2563 mg/kg of melamine, adding 1% of apparent crude protein content to the formula, where normal milk is 3.0% to 3.4% protein. Chen says a dean of a school of food science told him that it would take a university team 3 months to develop this kind of concoction. Investigators have concluded that as-yet-unidentified individuals cooked up a protocol for a premix, a solution normally designed to fortify foods with vitamins or other nutrients but, in this case, it was poisonous. Several milk-collecting companies were using the same premix, Chen says: "So someone with technical skill had to be training them."

==== Non-protein nitrogen as a feed additive ====
Ruminant animals can obtain protein from at least some forms of non-protein nitrogen (NPN) through fermentation by their rumen bacteria, hence NPN is often added to their diet to supplement protein. Nonruminants such as cats, dogs and pigs (and humans) cannot utilize NPN. NPN are given to ruminants in the form of pelleted urea, ammonium phosphate and/or biuret. Sometimes slightly polymerized special urea-formaldehyde resin or a mixture of urea and formaldehyde (both are also known as formaldehyde-treated urea) is used in place of urea, because the former provides a better control on the nitrogen release. This practice is carried out in China and other countries, such as Finland, India and France.

Cyanuric acid has also been used as NPN. For example, Archer Daniels Midland manufactures an NPN supplement for cattle, which contains biuret, triuret, cyanuric acid and urea. FDA permits a certain amount of cyanuric acid to be present in some additives used in animal feed and also drinking water.

Melamine use as NPN for cattle was described in a 1958 patent. In 1978, however, a study concluded that melamine "may not be an acceptable nonprotein N source for ruminants", because its hydrolysis in cattle is slower and less complete than other nitrogen sources such as cottonseed meal and urea.

In China, it is known that ground urea-formaldehyde resin is a common adulterant in feed for non-ruminants. Domestically it is often sold under the euphemism "protein essence" (蛋白精) and is described as "one kind of new proteinnitrogen feed additive". However, urea-formaldehyde resin itself has been suggested as appropriate for use in feed for some non-ruminants in at least one UN FAO report, suggesting its use as a binder in feed pellets in aquaculture.

There is at least one report of inexpensively priced rice protein concentrate (feed grade) containing non-protein nitrogen being marketed for use in non-ruminants dating back to 2005. In a news item on its website, Jiangyin Hetai Industrial Co., Ltd. warned its customers of low-priced "PSEUDO rice protein" for sale in the market by another unnamed supplier, noting that the contaminant could be detected by analyzing the isoelectric point. It is not clear from that report whether the contaminant in that case was melamine or some other non-protein nitrogen source or whether any contaminated rice protein concentrate made it into the food supply at that time.

On 18 April 2007, an ad was posted on the trading website Alibaba.com selling "Esb protein powder" in Xuzhou Anying's name. The product is said to be protein in nature and suitable for livestock and poultry feed, yet claims a crude protein content of 160–300%. It also mentions in passing the product makes use of "NPN" which is an acronym for non-protein nitrogen. Similar ads were placed on other websites, some dated as early as 31 October 2005. Products with similar descriptions were also sold as "EM bacterium active protein forage" by Shandong Binzhou Xinpeng Biosciences Company and "HP protein powder" by Shandong Jinan Together Biologic Technology Development Company.

==== Protein testing ====
Resonance structures of the peptide bond that links individual amino acids to form a protein polymer

Proteins, unlike most other food components, contain nitrogen, making nitrogen measurement a common surrogate for protein content. The standard tests for crude protein content used in the food industry (Kjeldahl method and Dumas method are used for official purposes) measure total nitrogen.

Accidental contamination and intentional adulteration of protein meals with non-protein nitrogen sources that inflate crude protein content measurements have been known to occur in the food industry for decades. To ensure food quality, purchasers of protein meals routinely conduct quality control tests designed to detect the most common non-protein nitrogen contaminants, such as urea and ammonium nitrate.

At least one pet food manufacturer not involved in any recalls, The Honest Kitchen, has reacted to the news of melamine contamination by announcing that it would add melamine testing to the suite of quality control tests it already conducted on all ingredients it purchases.

In at least one other segment of the food industry, the dairy industry, some countries (at least the U.S., Australia, France and Hungary), have adopted "true protein" measurement, as opposed to crude protein measurement, as the standard for payment and testing: "True protein is a measure of only the proteins in milk, whereas crude protein is a measure of all sources of nitrogen and includes nonprotein nitrogen, such as urea, which has no food value to humans. … Current milk-testing equipment measures peptide bonds, a direct measure of true protein." Measuring peptide bonds in grains has also been put into practice in several countries including Canada, the UK, Australia, Russia and Argentina where near-infrared reflectance (NIR) technology, a type of infrared spectroscopy is used. The Food and Agriculture Organization of the United Nations (FAO) recommends that only amino acid analysis be used to determine protein in, inter alia, foods used as the sole source of nourishment, such as infant formula, but also provides: "When data on amino acids analyses are not available, determination of protein based on total N content by Kjeldahl (AOAC, 2000) or similar method … is considered acceptable."

=== Allegations of manufacturing and product tampering ===
26 April 2007 and 27 April 2007 recalls by Blue Buffalo, Diamond, Harmony Farms, and Natural Balance are claimed by all 4 brands to be due to unauthorized inclusion of rice protein by American Nutrition, Inc. (ANI), their manufacturer. This adds a new potential source of contamination and distrust, namely non-compliant contract manufacturers, beyond the original problematic Chinese ingredient suppliers. Diamond and Natural Balance refer to this as a "manufacturing deviation" by ANI. Blue Buffalo and Harmony Farms characterize this as "product tampering" by ANI. ANI's recall notice makes no comment on these allegations.

=== Melamine adulteration and contamination in the U.S. ===
On 31 May 2007, the International Herald Tribune reported that melamine has also been purposely added as a binder to fish and livestock feed manufactured in the United States and traced to suppliers in Ohio and Colorado.

In autumn 2008, the Food and Drug Administration detected traces of melamine in one top-selling brand of infant formula and traces of cyanuric acid in another brand. Separately, a third major formula maker said that in-house tests had detected trace levels of melamine in its infant formula. The three firms manufacture more than 90 percent of all infant formula produced in the United States. The FDA and other experts said the melamine contamination in U.S.-made formula had occurred unintentionally during the manufacturing process and were not a safety concern.

== Impact on human food supply ==
In early 2007, U.S. officials publicly said that they do not believe melamine alone to be harmful to humans. However, there was too little data at that time to determine how it reacts with other substances, in particular, the combination of melamine with cyanuric acid, a similar chemical known to be found in the waste product of at least some methods of melamine production, and which combination some American and Canadian scientists have suggested may have led to the pet deaths through kidney failure. On 25 May 2007 in a US FDA/CSFAN Interim Melamine and Analogues Safety/Risk Assessment, the FDA stated: "While it is entirely possible that the analogues are more or less potent than the parent compound, melamine, we have no information that assesses the relative potency of the three analogues as compared to melamine; therefore, for the purpose of this interim assessment, we have made an assumption of equal potency. It has been hypothesized that melamine may interact synergistically with its three analogues, but no studies have been conducted that specifically test this hypothesis. Very preliminary work suggests that if it does occur, the formation of lattice crystals, particularly between melamine and cyanuric acid, takes place at very high dose levels and is a threshold and concentration dependent phenomenon that would not be relevant to low levels of exposure. Although still under investigation, it now appears that the combination of melamine and cyanuric acid has been linked to the acute renal failure in cats and dogs that have eaten the suspect pet foods...."

In the United States, five potential vectors of impact on the human food supply have been identified. The first, which has already been acknowledged to have occurred by FDA and USDA officials, is via contaminated ingredients imported for use in pet foods and sold for use as salvage in animal feed which has been fed to some number of hogs and chickens, the meat from which has been processed and sold to some number of consumers: "There is very low risk to human health" in such cases involving pork and poultry. On 1 May 2007, the FDA and USDA stated that millions of chickens fed feed tainted with contaminated pet food had been consumed by an estimated 2.5 to 3 million people.

The second potential vector is via contaminated vegetable proteins imported for intended use as animal feed, which has apparently been acknowledged to occur with regard to fish feed in Canada, while the third possible route is via contaminated vegetable proteins imported for intended use in human food products, and the FDA has issued an import alert subjecting all Chinese vegetable proteins to detention without examination.

A fourth potential vector is referred to on 10 May 2007 FDA-USDA press conference, viz. incorporation of contaminated vegetable proteins into products intended for human use and subsequent importation.

A fifth vector is acknowledged to have occurred on 30 May 2007 FDA/USDA press conference, whereby U.S. manufacturers of livestock and shrimp/fish feed have acknowledged adding melamine to their products as a binder.

The original Xuzhou Anying wheat gluten was "human grade," as opposed to "feed grade," meaning that it could have been used to make food for humans such as bread or pasta. At least one contaminated batch was used to make food for humans, but the FDA quarantined it before any was sold. The FDA also notified the Centers for Disease Control and Prevention to watch for new patients admitted to hospitals with renal failure. As of April 2007, there were no observed increases in human illnesses, and little human food tested as contaminated.

Reports of widespread melamine adulteration in Chinese animal feed have raised the possibility of wider melamine contamination in the human food supply in China and abroad. Despite the widely reported ban on melamine use in vegetable proteins in China, at least some chemical manufacturers continue to report selling it for use in animal feed and in products for human consumption. Said Li Xiuping, a manager at Henan Xinxiang Huaxing Chemical in Henan Province: "Our chemical products are mostly used for additives, not for animal feed. Melamine is mainly used in the chemical industry, but it can also be used in making cakes."

In 2009, the World Health Organization (WHO) published a report on a December 2008 expert meeting held in conjunction with the FAO concluding, inter alia, that "a tolerable daily intake (TDI) of 0.2 mg/kg body weight for melamine was established. The TDI is applicable to the whole population, including infants." However, the experts also noted: "This TDI is applicable to exposure to melamine alone. … Available data indicate that simultaneous exposure to melamine and cyanuric acid is more toxic than exposures to each compound individually. Data are not adequate to allow the calculation of a health-based guidance value for this co-exposure."

=== In the United States ===
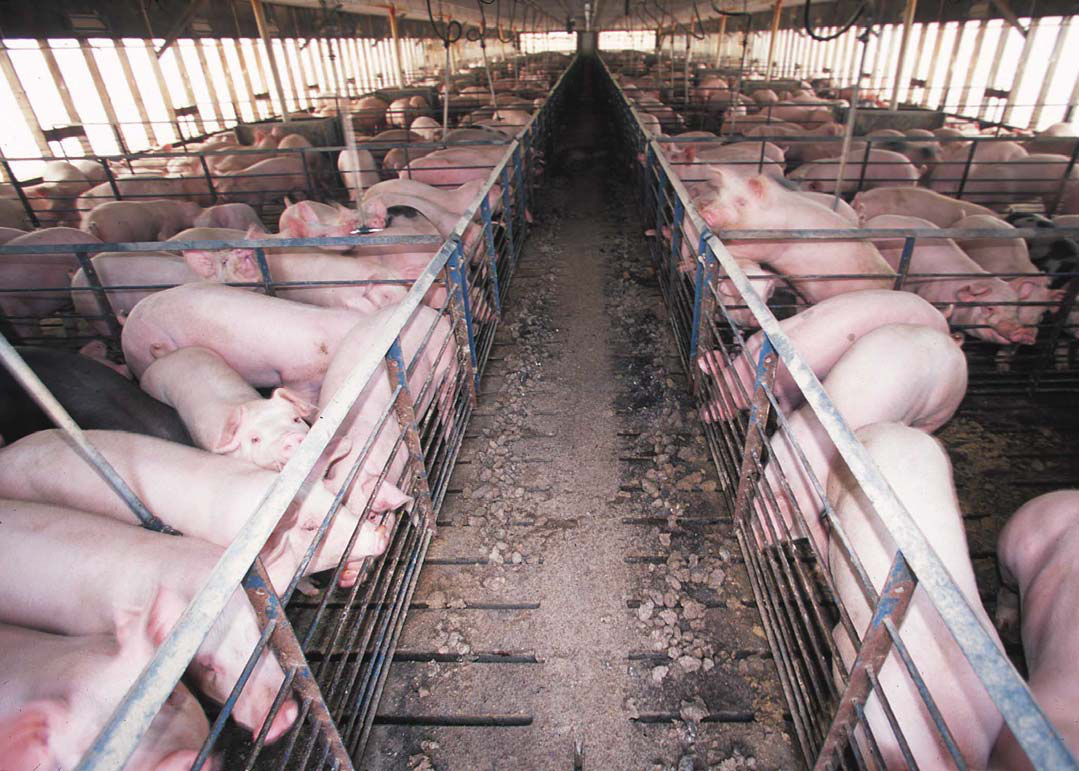
Whole hogs that had eaten contaminated feed were sold to individuals in California.

On 3 April 2007, The Boston Globe reported that tainted wheat gluten ended up in factories that produce food for human consumption. Then, on 19 April, federal U.S. officials said that they were investigating reports that Binzhou Futian rice protein had been used in hog feed, but declined to specify where. The California Department of Food and Agriculture placed American Hog Farm in Ceres, California under quarantine, after melamine was found in the urine of the hogs on the farm. According to California state officials, approximately 45 state residents consumed pork from hogs that had been fed melamine-contaminated feed. The FDA subsequently discovered that melamine was present in feed that had been given to hogs in California, New York, North Carolina, South Carolina, Utah, and possibly Ohio. In response, the FDA announced that, in addition to its existing practice of testing of wheat gluten and rice protein products for melamine, it would begin testing imported ingredients and finished products that contain cornmeal, corn gluten, rice bran and soy protein for the presence of melamine or cyanuric acid. The agency also subjected all vegetable proteins imported from China, intended for human or animal consumption, to detention without physical examination, beginning on 27 April. Finally, the FDA investigated domestic food manufacturers to ensure that no contaminated product was being used in foods intended for human use.

On 28 April 2007, the USDA and the FDA held a joint press release, acknowledging that pork from hogs fed contaminated feed had entered the human food supply, but emphasizing that the risk of illness from eating such pork was "very low". On 30 April, they amended this statement to include poultry as well, after it was found that chickens in Indiana had been fed the contaminated feed. On 8 May, fish at several hatcheries in Oregon were also discovered to have consumed contaminated feed, but these fish were similarly not seen as a significant human health risk.

Throughout April and May, the USDA investigated the potential human health risks of consuming the meat of animals that had eaten contaminated feed, and continued to hold press conferences discussing their latest findings. They consistently found that consuming pork and poultry from such sources did not pose a significant health risk, even after factoring in potential interactions between melamine and cyanuric acid. The Centers for Disease Control and Prevention also monitored hospitals and poison control centers during this period, and reported on 2 May 2007 that there had been no increase in reports of kidney disease. USDA ultimately cleared the affected swine for human consumption on 15 May 2007.

After learning that infant formula from one firm in China was potentially contaminated with melamine, the FDA updated its risk assessment on 3 October 2008 (and again on 28 November 2008) to indicate that infants could be more sensitive than adults to melamine exposure.

=== Human food supply outside of U.S. ===
On 7 June 2007, the European Food Safety Authority (EFSA) issued a provisional statement, noting that they were investigation potential synergistic effects between melamine and cyanuric acid. However, by 21 June, the Health & Consumer Protection Directorate-General of the European Commission found that there was "no need to take restrictive measures" on livestock who had eaten contaminated feed, nor on food products derived from such animals.

In 2008, the reports of contaminated powdered milk in China led to renewed examination of potential health risks. The EFSA issued a press release on 25 September 2008, noting that children who consumed above-average levels of milk products could potentially be at risk. A report from the Chinese Ministry of Health found that 294,000 infants in China had been affected by melamine-contaminated infant formula by the end of November 2008. More than 50,000 infants were hospitalized, and six deaths were confirmed, as a result of this contamination.

== Impact on human pharmaceutical supply ==
In August 2009 the United States Food and Drug Administration advised pharmaceutical manufacturers that they should determine if they are using components possibly contaminated with melamine and test those components at risk, as well as make sure they get certifications from suppliers that at-risk components have been tested appropriately. A new guidance lists 27 components the agency considers to be at risk of melamine contamination based on its search of U.S. Pharmacopeia/National Formulary monographs and its Inactive Ingredient Database. The list — which includes adenine, ammonium salts, gelatin, guar gum, lactose, povidone and taurine — is not all-inclusive, the guidance says. "For the purpose of this guidance, we use the term at-risk component to mean those ingredients or raw materials that rely on a test for nitrogen content for their identity or purity or strength, and that contain nitrogen in amounts greater than 2.5 percent."

== Reaction ==
=== In China ===
==== Chinese government ====
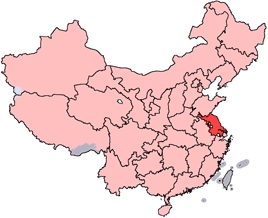
The contaminated wheat gluten came from a company located in the Jiangsu Province in eastern China.

Once wheat gluten had been isolated as the source of the problems, federal investigators in the United States began to trace the gluten used in the foods. All of the gluten came from ChemNutra's Kansas City warehouse. ChemNutra said it had imported nearly 800 tonnes of wheat gluten from the Xuzhou Anying Biologic Technology Development Company of Xuzhou, Jiangsu, China between 29 November and 8 March. ChemNutra says the gluten came directly from China or from China through the Netherlands, and that the company had received no reports of contamination in the chemical analysis provided by Xuzhou Anying Biologic Technology Development Company. The products were shipped from the company's Kansas City warehouse to several pet food manufacturers and one distributor of pet food ingredients in the US and Canada, including the companies affected by the recall. Xuzhou Anying also exports carrots, garlic, ginger, corn protein powder, vegetables and feed.

On 5 April 2007, several days after the United States halted all wheat gluten imports, the Chinese government categorically denied any connection to the North American food poisonings to The New York Times, claiming they had no record of exporting any agricultural products that could have tainted the recalled pet foods, including the wheat gluten that had been the focus of the investigation. The general manager of the Xuzhou Anying Biologic Technology Development Company also denied that they had exported any wheat gluten to North America. However, on 6 April, the Chinese government told the Associated Press they would investigate the source of the wheat gluten. Although the government refused to give details on the investigation, the Xinhua News Agency stated that "sampling and examination" of wheat gluten was under way across China, centering on the presence of melamine. Officials with the Office of the General Administration of Quality Supervision, Inspection and Quarantine, said that they will stay in touch with the U.S. Embassy in Beijing and that "further measures would be taken based on developments in the United States". The U.S. FDA requested to inspect facilities suspected of manufacturing contaminated products on 4 April; the Chinese government initially refused this request, before ultimately granting FDA investigators permission to enter the country on 23 April.

On 25 April 2007, Chinese authorities shut down Binzhou Futian Biology Technology Co. Ltd., and detained its manager, Tian Feng. Feng denied responsibility, saying that he "didn't do anything wrong", and denying that he even knew what melamine was. The following day, China's Foreign Ministry said it has banned the use of melamine in food products, admitting that products containing melamine had cleared customs while continuing to dispute the role of melamine in causing pet deaths. China also vowed to cooperate with U.S. investigators to find the "real cause" of pet deaths. China provided a transcript of a 26 April press conference, indicating that an invitation to FDA investigators had been sent on 23 April but making no mention of banning melamine usage. On 3 May 2007, Chinese authorities detained Mao Lijun, general manager of the Xuzhou Anying Biologic Technology Development, one of the companies accused of exporting contaminated protein, on unspecified charges.

On 29 May 2007, in actions not linked directly to the protein export scandal, Zheng Xiaoyu (郑筱萸), the former head of China's State Food and Drug Administration (SFDA), had been convicted of personally approving unproven and unsafe medicines after taking bribes from eight pharmaceutical companies totaling more than 6.49 million RMB (approximately 850,000 US dollars). These fraudulent approvals were estimated to have resulted in hundreds of patient deaths; consequently, Zheng was sentenced to death. It was also discovered during his eight years as head of the SFDA, Zheng had personally ordered the approval of more than 150,000 new medicines; by contrast, the U.S. FDA approves approximately 140 new medications per year. Most of those 150,000 medicines were manufactured by the eight pharmaceutical companies that bribed Zheng; one such unsafe medication, produced by the now-defunct Anhui Hua Yuan (华源) Company, resulted in 14 patient deaths and hundreds becoming permanently disabled. Zheng's former deputy was also convicted as an accomplice and given a two-year delayed death sentence.

After these convictions, it was announced that a new system for unsafe food recall would be implemented by the end of 2007. By the end of August 2007, Xinhua reported that China had instituted new product recall and customer notification systems. Further customer protection measures were introduced in response to the 2008 Chinese milk scandal. A Xinhua article from September 2008 lists the following information as "Lessons Learned" from the milk scandal: "Sanlu, the center of the scandal, provided a bad example of crisis management. When it was first exposed, Sanlu refused to take the blame and passed the buck to innocent dairy farmers, which ignited great anger nationwide. A further official investigation showed Sanlu had lied about its contaminated baby formula for months while thousands of infants got sick and at least three died. Sanlu didn't openly admit its products were toxic until Sept. 11. It eventually recalled baby formula manufactured on and before Aug. 6."

=== In the United States ===
==== Federal government ====
All of the food recalls executed by companies in the United States and Canada were voluntary, i.e. not mandated by any government agency. In the United States, prior to the recall, the Food and Drug Administration did not keep pet foods under the same level of protection and safety ensurance as food intended for human consumption. According to the FDA, the FDA's "regulation of pet food is similar to that for other animal feeds. The Federal Food, Drug, and Cosmetic Act (FFDCA) requires that pet foods, like human foods, be pure and wholesome, safe to eat, produced under sanitary conditions, contain no harmful substances, and be truthfully labeled." However, "there is no requirement that pet food products have premarket approval by FDA."

Once the recall was announced, the Food and Drug Administration immediately began to mobilize resources to assist in the investigation. The FDA has dedicated each of its 20 district offices and three field laboratories to the investigation and more than "400 employees are involved in sample pet food collection, monitoring of recall effectiveness, and preparing consumer complaint reports." The FDA has activated its Emergency Operations Center, making sure the information on the poisoning gets to scientists and inspection teams. The agency "is also working with its regulatory partners in all 50 state agriculture and health agencies to inform them of the status of the investigative and analytical efforts." The FDA issued an alert to its field personnel that they should block import of wheat gluten from Xuzhou Anying Biologic Technology Development Company Ltd., and subject wheat gluten from China and the Netherlands to increased scrutiny.

As a result of the contamination, consumers and pets' rights groups have called for the FDA to take a more active role in ensuring pet food safety. On 2 April 2007, People for the Ethical Treatment of Animals called for the resignation of the FDA's commissioner, Dr. Andrew von Eschenbach. Possibly in response to growing concern about ensuring the safety of the U.S. food supply, on 1 May 2007, Dr. von Eschenbach announced the creation of an Assistant Commissioner for Food Protection to advise on "strategic and substantive food safety and food defense matters." Dr. David Acheson will fill this roll. According to Dr. von Eschenbach, "The protection of America's food supply and therefore the safety of Americans eating food of domestic or international origin is of utmost importance to me as a physician, and to the mission of this agency."

===== U.S. Congress =====
In the aftermath of the recall, there was a call from consumers for an investigation into Menu Foods reaction to the poisonings, and the federal government's stand on pet food safety and quality control and the FDA's response to the recall. On 1 April 2007, Senator Dick Durbin (D – Illinois) called on the FDA to "account for weak links in the pet food inspection system." Earlier in the week, Representative Rosa DeLauro (D – Connecticut) asked for an analysis of the FDA's oversight of pet food manufacturing facilities and a report of actions taken since the recall.

On 6 April 2007, Senator Durbin criticized the federal inspection process for both human and pet food and called for the hearings on the matter. According to the Los Angeles Times who interviewed Durbin 8 April, Durbin said he would like to see the FDA set national standards and inspection rules for pet food manufacturing facilities, and to see "federal law changed to allow the FDA to order a recall of food intended for human or pet consumption rather than rely on companies to do it voluntarily."

Durbin was working with Senator Herb Kohl (D – Wisconsin), the Chairman of the United States Senate Appropriations Subcommittee on Agriculture, Rural Development, Food and Drug Administration, and Related Agencies. Senator Kohl initiated hearings in the Senate Appropriations Subcommittee along with Senator Durbin and Senator Bob Bennett (R – Utah). Senator Robert Byrd (D – West Virginia), from the United States Senate Committee on Appropriations was there as well. Witnesses included FDA officials. They looked into several areas: the delay in reporting by Menu Foods, the lack of federal inspections of pet food facilities, and incomplete reporting by the FDA since the start of the recall.

During the hearing Senators Durbin and Byrd criticized the government's response during the recall. Durbin specifically criticized the lack of any regular inspection practices or quality control with regards to pet food safety. Senator Kohl criticized the FDA's communication to the public about recalled foods, noting that volunteer websites had more detailed and easier-to-access information about the extent of the problem and which specific foods are of concern than FDA's online resources which Kohl said was contradictory of itself at times, and which the FDA official giving testimony admitted to being difficult to navigate.

On 18 April 2007, Senator Durbin and Representative DeLauro met with US FDA Commissioner von Eschenbach to discuss the additional rice protein recalls and learned that the Chinese government was blocking outside attempts to investigate the contamination. In response, they sent a letter to Zhou Wenzong, China's Ambassador to the United States saying in part that "contaminated batches of wheat gluten and rice protein responsible for these events were imported from China" and that "no level of melamine should be found in pet or human food" and asking for visas for inspectors from the United States.

==== Public ====
The protein export scandal inspired a significant amount of US media attention to Chinese food safety concerns, and increased unease about Chinese imports amongst the American public. A July 2007 Consumer Reports poll found that 92 percent of Americans favored "country of origin" labeling on meat products, while in a USA Today/Gallup poll, 74 percent of US respondents said they were "somewhat concerned" or "very concerned" about the safety of food imported from China.
