= 2007 pet food recalls =

Recall of melamine-contaminated pet food

Beginning in March 2007, there was a widespread recall of many brands of cat and dog foods due to contamination with melamine and cyanuric acid. The recalls in North America, Europe, and South Africa came in response to reports of kidney failure in pets. Initially, the recalls were associated with the consumption of mostly wet pet foods made with wheat gluten from a single Chinese company.

After more than three weeks of complaints from consumers, the recall began voluntarily with the Canadian company Menu Foods on 16 March 2007, when a company test showed sickness and death in some of the test animals. In the following weeks, several other companies that had received the contaminated wheat gluten also voluntarily recalled dozens of pet food brands. One month after the initial recall, contaminated rice protein from a different source in China was also identified as being associated with kidney failure in pets in the United States, while contaminated corn gluten was associated with kidney failure with pets in South Africa. As a result of investigating the 2007 pet food recalls, a broader Chinese protein export contamination investigation unfolded, raising concerns about the safety of the human food supply.

By the end of March, veterinary organizations reported more than 100 pet deaths among nearly 500 cases of kidney failure. However, many sources speculate that the actual number of affected pets may never be known, and experts think that the actual death toll could potentially reach into the thousands. In the United States there was extensive media coverage of the recall, with calls for greater government regulation. Reports of widespread and possibly intentional adulteration of Chinese animal feed with melamine raised the issue of melamine contamination in the human food supply, both in China and abroad.

Research has focused on the combination of melamine and cyanuric acid in causing kidney failure. Reports that cyanuric acid may be an independently and potentially widely used adulterant in China have heightened concerns for both pet and human health. In 2008 baby foods contaminated with melamine in China affected an estimated 300,000 children, with hospitalisations and deaths.

== Recall history ==
The first recalls were announced by Menu Foods late on Friday, 16 March 2007, for cat and dog food products in the United States. In the ensuing months, many additional recalls were announced by Menu and other companies as the recall expanded throughout North America and to Europe and South Africa. Menu Foods acknowledged receiving the first complaints of sick pets on 20 February 2007, and initiated the recall following unexpected deaths after a regularly scheduled internal "taste test".

Overall, several major companies have recalled more than 5300 pet food products, with most of the recalls coming from Menu Foods. The contamination was caused by melamine in the affected foods. The Chinese company behind the contaminated wheat gluten has initially denied any involvement in the contamination, but is cooperating with Chinese and American investigators.

The recalls are related to contaminated vegetable proteins, imported from China in 2006 and early 2007, used as pet food ingredients. The process of identifying and accounting for the source of the contamination and how the contaminant causes sickness is ongoing.

== Affected brands ==
Note: The following list may not be complete. Please refer to the external links section for more resources.

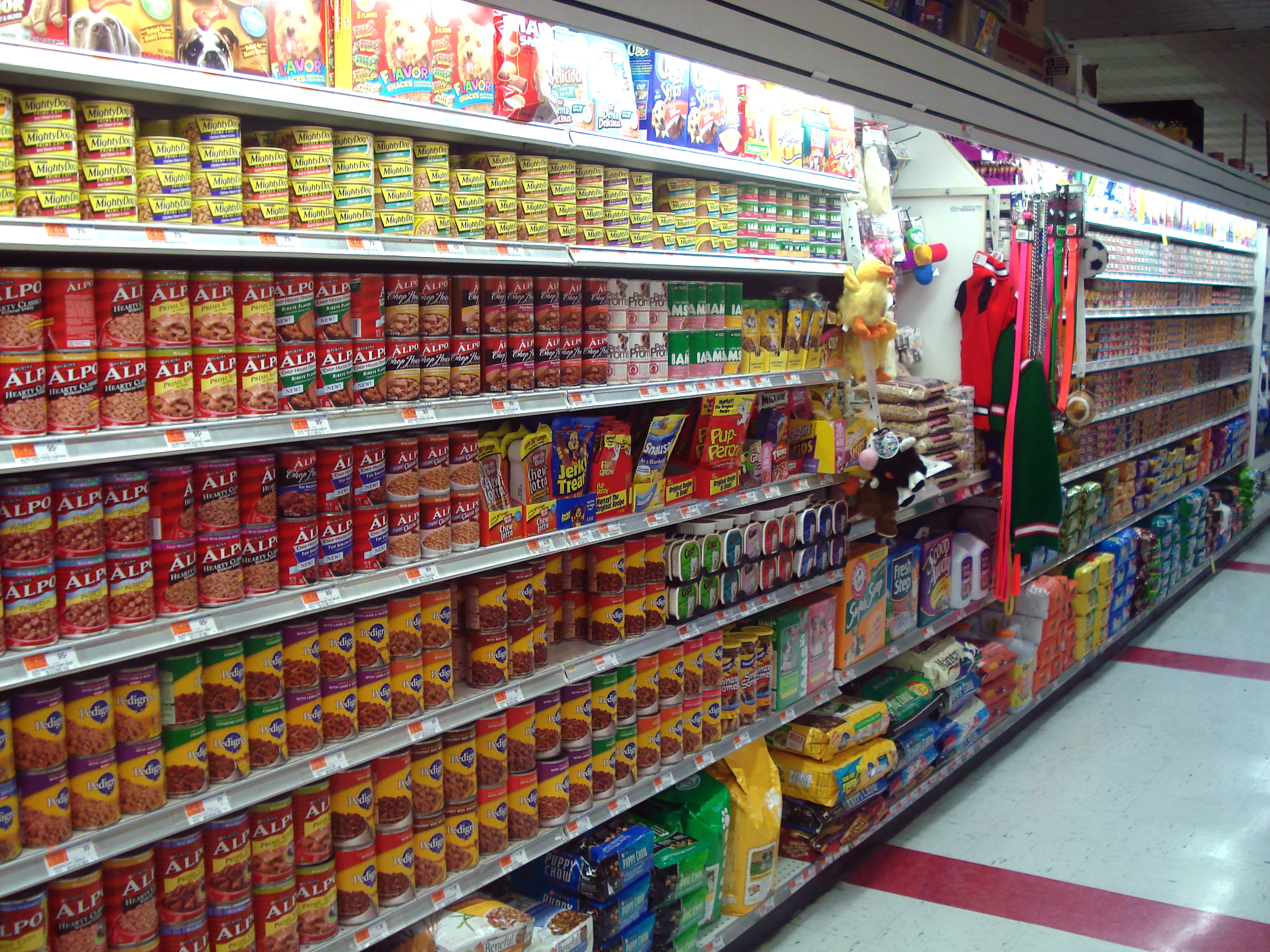
Pet food is a US$38 billion industry.

The majority of recalled foods have come from a single company, Menu Foods of Streetsville, Ontario. Menu Foods' recalled products alone represent nearly 100 brands of cat and dog food, and as of 11 April, are the only brands known to have caused sickness in animals. Below is an overview of affected brands, as provided by the FDA and the companies:

- Menu Foods: Over 50 brands of dog food, and over 40 brands of cat food. Almost all of the foods are wet foods, specifically the 'cuts and gravy' varieties. As a precautionary measure, Menu Foods also recalled all brands of food with wheat gluten in them even though the source of the gluten was not the same as the source behind the contaminated findings.
- Sunshine Mills: Around 20 brands of dry dog biscuit
- Nestlé Purina PetCare: All sizes and varieties of Alpo "Prime Cuts in Gravy"
- Del Monte: More than a dozen brands of dry, or jerky-type, cat and dog snacks and/or morsels
- Hill's Pet Nutrition: Science Diet Savory Cuts and a single dry cat food product, "Prescription Diet m/d Feline"
- Royal Canin Canada: Medi-Cal Feline Dissolution formula (canned)
- Royal Canin United States: Eight varieties of Sensible Choice, three varieties of Veterinary Diet, six varieties of Kasco dog and one variety of Kasco cat food
- Natural Balance Pet Foods: Venison and Brown Rice canned and bagged dog foods, Venison and Brown Rice dog treats, Venison and Green Pea dry cat food, Chicken Formula Canned Dog Food 13 oz, Lamb Formula Canned Dog Food 13 oz, Beef Formula Canned Dog Food 13 oz, and Ocean Fish Formula Canned Cat Food
- The Blue Buffalo Company: Spa Select Kitten dry food, all canned and biscuit products
- SmartPak LiveSmart Weight Management Chicken and Brown Rice Dog Food
- Chenango Valley Pet Foods: Doctors Foster & Smith Chicken and Brown Rice Formula Adult Lite Cat and Dog Foods; Doctors Foster & Smith Lamb and Brown Rice Formula Adult Dog Food; Lick Your Chops Lamb Meal, Rice and Egg Cat Food; Shop Rite Redi-Mixt Dog Food; SHEP chunk-style dog food; 8 in 1 Ferret Ultra-Blend Advanced nutrition Diet; Health Diet Cat Food Chicken and Rice Dinner; Evolve Kitten Formula; bulk Lamb and Brown Rice Formula Dog Food; and bulk Chicken and Brown Rice Formula Adult Lite Dog Food
- Kirkland Signature: Super Premium Canned Food, item # 38436, best-by dates of "Aug. 21 08" to "15 April of 09"
- Diamond Pet Foods: Chicken Soup for the Pet Lover's Soul Kitten Formula 5.5 oz. cans, Chicken Soup for the Pet Lover's Soul Puppy Formula 13 oz. cans, Diamond Lamb & Rice Formula for Dogs 13 oz. cans and Nutra Nuggets Lamb Meal and Rice Formula dry dog food

The American Veterinary Medical Association (AVMA) maintains a combined list of all recalled pet food varieties.

== Impact on pets ==
=== Numbers of affected animals ===
By the end of March, veterinary organizations reported more than 100 pet deaths amongst nearly 500 cases of kidney failure, and experts expected the death toll to number in the thousands, with one online database already self-reporting as many as 3,600 deaths as of 11 April. The U.S. Food and Drug Administration has received reports of approximately 8500 animal deaths, including at least 1950 cats and 2200 dogs who have died after eating contaminated food, but have only confirmed 14 cases, in part because there is no centralized government database of animal sickness or death in the United States as there are with humans (such as the Centers for Disease Control). For this reason, many sources speculate the full extent of the pet deaths and sicknesses caused by the contamination may never be known. In October, the results of the "AAVLD survey of pet food-induced nephrotoxicity in North America, April to June 2007," were reported, indicating 347 of 486 cases voluntarily reported by 6 June 2007 had met the diagnostic criteria, with most of the cases reported from the United States, but also including cases of 20 dogs and 7 cats reported from Canada. The cases involved 235 cats and 112 dogs, with 61 percent of the cats and 74 percent of the dogs having died. Dr. Barbara Powers, AAVLD president and director of the Colorado State University Veterinary Diagnostic Laboratory, said the survey probably found only a percentage of the actual cases. She also said the mortality rate is not likely to be representative of all cases, because survey respondents had more information to submit for animals that had died. A number of dogs were also reported affected in Australia, with four in Melbourne and a few more in Sydney. No legal action or repercussions have as yet occurred regarding these cases. Dr. Powers elaborated further: "But there absolutely could be more deaths from the tainted pet food.... This survey didn't catch all the deaths that happened. In order to be counted in our survey, you had to meet certain criteria.... If someone had a pet that died and they buried it in their back[yard], they weren't eligible for our survey. We had to have confirmed exposure to the recalled pet food, proof of toxicity, and clinical signs of kidney failure. So this is only a percentage of the deaths that are out there. There's no way to guess how many pets were affected."

In a potentially related incident in China, on 22 February 2006, Xinhua reported at least 38 cats dying shortly after being fed with Xiduoyu, a brand of a "Tianjin-based cat food manufacturer". A veterinarian referred to in the story said "test results from Beijing Animal Hospital showed the dead cats had suffered from kidney exhaustion and that the sick ones have kidney damage." Suspicions at that time focused on lead poisoning though Gu Junhua, a chief engineer from China's "national feedstuff quality check centre under the Ministry of Agriculture", was reported as saying: "But at present, he said it was difficult to draw any conclusions because the country has not drafted any food safety criteria for pets in terms of the quality and quantity of each element of the ingredients." No mention of melamine was made.

=== Symptoms ===
Pet owners were advised to monitor their animals for the following signs of possible kidney failure that may be associated with the unknown toxicant: loss of appetite, lethargy, depression, vomiting, diarrhea, sudden changes in water consumption, and changes in the frequency or amount of urination. It was advised that pets exhibiting these symptoms should be taken for veterinary care as soon as possible, even if the animal did not eat any of the recalled pet food, as these signs may be indicative of other illnesses. Ultrasounds of animals who have eaten the contaminated food in most cases show cortical echogenicity, perirenal fluid and pyelectasia.

One of the largest veterinary hospital chains in the U.S., Banfield, has released statistics on the recent rates of pet kidney failure. Banfield's veterinarians treat an estimated 6 percent of the nation's cats and dogs, and their findings provide "the most authoritative picture of the harm done by the tainted cat and dog food," according to the FDA. Based on analysis of data collected by more than 600 hospitals and clinics in 43 states, out of every 10,000 cats and dogs seen in Banfield clinics, three developed kidney failure during the time pet food contaminated with melamine was on the market. They reported 284 more cases of kidney failure in cats than the expected "background rate", corresponding to a 30 percent increase. During that period, the Banfield vets saw 100,000 cats. According to Hugh Lewis, who analyzed the results for Banfield, extrapolating to the United States cat population may mean "several hundred cats a week across the country" were affected. No similar statistically significant increase was seen among dogs, suggesting the contamination was more toxic to cats.

=== Prevention of illness in pets ===
As of 4 May, the FDA advised: "If your pet food is not listed [as recalled on its website], the pet food is not affected by the recall and you can continue to feed it to your pets; however, if your pet exhibits a sudden onset of symptoms including loss of appetite, lethargy, vomiting, stop feeding the pet food and contact your veterinarian."

The growing number of recalls has motivated at least one well-known animal protection organization, the American Society for the Prevention of Cruelty to Animals (ASPCA) to recommend "until this crisis is resolved ... pets be fed products containing U. S.-sourced protein supplements only."

=== Food shortages in pet shelters ===
Many nonprofit pet shelters rely on donated foods to feed the animals and remain financially stable, but due to the wide use of wheat gluten and other contaminated ingredients in many wet pet foods and the large portion of foods represented in the recall, many pet shelters have had to discard foods despite the financial burden of doing so.

== Search for the cause of the illnesses ==
Unable to locate the source of the kidney failure exhibited by test subjects that consumed some of their wet food products, Menu Foods sent food samples to Cornell University between 13 March and 15 March for chemical analysis. They too, were not immediately able to pinpoint the cause of the sicknesses, so they sent samples to the New York State Food Laboratory, a part of the federally funded Food Emergency Response Network.

=== Initial efforts focus on aminopterin ===
On 23 March, the New York State Food Laboratory reported that aminopterin was found in samples sent to them by Cornell. Michigan State University also investigated the source of the kidney failure and made available to researchers and veterinarians pictures and photographs of affected animal kidneys "demonstrating acute tubular necrosis in the kidney with intratubular crystals." Aminopterin was widely described in news reports as a "rat poison", though that assertion may be based upon a hypothetical use listed in the 1951 patent application and not upon the actual use of the chemical. Aminopterin is illegal in China, and neither Cornell University nor the FDA could replicate the New York lab's results. On 27 March, the American Society for the Prevention of Cruelty to Animals reported the symptoms described in affected animals are not "fully consistent with the ingestion of rat poison containing aminopterin."

=== Later findings change focus to melamine ===
Sometime in mid-March, an "unnamed pet food company" reported to Cornell they had discovered an industrial chemical used in plastics manufacture, melamine, in internal testing of wheat gluten samples. By 21 March, it became clear the common factor was in the wheat gluten used to thicken the gravy in the "cuts and gravy" style wet foods. By 27 March, Cornell had confirmed the presence of melamine in the originally recalled pet foods, the wheat gluten used in their manufacture, the cells of the dead pets, and in the urine samples from dead and sick pets. On 30 March, both Cornell and the FDA announced the presence of melamine had been confirmed. The chemical was found in the suspected wheat gluten in raw concentrations as high as 6.6%. Stephen Sundlof, the FDA's chief veterinarian said, "There was a sizable amount of melamine. You could see crystals in the wheat gluten."

In addition to wheat gluten, products containing rice protein have also been contaminated with melamine. Natural Balance Pet Foods recalled two products on 16 April due to kidney damage associated with melamine contamination despite the products not containing wheat gluten. Melamine has also been implicated in corn gluten in South Africa.

Despite the presence of the industrial chemical in both the food and in the animals, the FDA has made it clear they are still in the middle of an extensive investigation, and "not yet fully certain that melamine is the causative agent."

=== Melamine and cyanuric acid in pet sickness ===
Melamine molecule, C_{3} H_{6} N_{6} — 1,3,5-triazine-2,4,6-triamine

Prior animal studies have shown ingestion of melamine may lead to kidney stones, cancer or reproductive damage. One 1945 study suggested the chemical increased urine output when fed to dogs in large amounts. The chemical is known to have a very low toxicity in rodents. The U.S. FDA knows of no studies of melamine involving felines and, if melamine is responsible, the increased sensitivity of cats is a mystery to officials. One hypothesis is the poisoned cat foods might have higher concentrations of melamine than the dog foods. Melamine can be detected in blood or urine tests.

Stephen Sundlof, director of the FDA's Center for Veterinary Medicine, says "Melamine is not very toxic as a chemical, so we're wondering why we are seeing the kinds of serious conditions, especially the kidney failure, that we're seeing in cats and dogs... We are focusing on the melamine right now because we believe that, even if melamine is not the causative agent, it is somehow associated with the causative agent, so it serves as a marker". Even at the highest observed concentrations found in wheat gluten, the melamine exposure is much smaller than the rat and mouse doses for which effects were seen. Instead, the FDA has suggested a second contaminant may be responsible for the ill effects and melamine, as the most easily identifiable contaminant, may serve as a biomarker, or indicator, for contaminated wheat gluten.

According to the FDA, "the association between melamine in the kidneys and urine of cats that died and melamine in the food they consumed is undeniable. Additionally, melamine is an ingredient that should not be in pet food at any level." However, Richard Goldstein of the Cornell University College of Veterinary Medicine has stated that "There appears to be other things in there, other than melamine, but identifying what they are is a long process."

Melamine (green) and cyanuric acid (red) easily form hydrogen bonds (blue dotted lines) with each other.

Researchers have focused on the role of melamine and related compounds in causing kidney failure. Beginning on 19 April, researchers reportedly had ruled out aminopterin contamination and had found a "spoke-like crystal" in contaminated wheat gluten and rice protein concentrate and the tissues and urine of affected animals. (It was previously known that melamine and cyanuric acid can form networks of hydrogen bonds, creating a tile-like planar structure through molecular self-assembly.) The crystal has been said to serve as a biomarker for contamination and is approximately 30% melamine. The remainder has been identified as cyanuric acid, ammelide and ammeline, with crystals recovered from urine reported to be approximately 70% cyanuric acid. While some researchers have theorized the three latter chemicals might have been formed as the animals metabolized the melamine, or as byproducts of bacterial metabolism (cyanuric acid is a known intermediate byproduct of bacterial metabolism of melamine), their presence in the crystals found in contaminated protein itself, combined with media reports of widespread adulteration with both melamine and cyanuric acid in China, has focused research efforts on their combined effects in animals. Neither melamine nor cyanuric acid, a chemical commonly used in pool chlorination, have been thought to be particularly toxic by themselves. The current hypothesis is, although these contaminants are not very toxic individually, their potency appears to be increased when they are present together.

On 27 April, researchers from the University of Guelph, in Ontario announced they had created crystals chemically similar to the ones found in contaminated animals by combining melamine and cyanuric acid in the laboratory under pH conditions similar to those in animal kidneys.

In light of these findings, on 1 May, the American Veterinary Medical Association noted in a press release the "extremely insoluble" crystals formed in animal kidneys are suspected of blocking kidney function. On 7 May, however, Barbara Powers, president of the American Association of Veterinary Laboratory Diagnosticians and a professor of veterinary diagnostics at Colorado State University cautioned "There's something more going on than just the mechanical blockage. Because you wouldn't see so much necrosis (cell death) and inflammation."

On 2 May, in further inquiry into the source of the cyanuric acid in the contaminated ingredients and the toxic effects of the chemical combination, Richard Goldstein of the Cornell University College of Veterinary Medicine, in response to reports the contaminant might be "melamine scrap" left over from processing coal into melamine, hypothesized: "It's possible the other stuff they were left with was the bottom-of-the-barrel stuff, leftover melamine and possibly cyanuric acid. I think it's this melamine with other compounds that is toxic." The composition of the crystals analyzed in contaminated pet food ingredients is similar to the composition of a waste product produced in cyanuric acid production.

On 8 May 2007, the International Herald Tribune reported three Chinese chemical makers have said animal feed producers often purchase, or seek to purchase, the chemical, cyanuric acid, from their factories to blend into animal feed to give the false appearance of a higher level of protein, suggesting another potentially dangerous way that melamine and cyanuric acid might combine in protein products.

A toxicology study conducted at the University of California, Davis School of Veterinary Medicine after the recalls concluded the combination of melamine and cyanuric acid in diet does lead to acute kidney injury in cats. Wilson Rumbeiha, an associate professor in MSU's Diagnostic Center for Population and Animal Health, commenting on results from a survey commissioned by the American Association of Veterinary Laboratory Diagnosticians and designed and implemented by MSU toxicologists which was also presented at the AAVLD's October 2007 meeting, said: "Unfortunately, these [melamine cyanurate] crystals don't dissolve easily. They go away slowly, if at all, so there is the potential for chronic toxicity."

== Alternative pet food sources ==
Some pet owners have become concerned over the safety of all processed pet foods, and have chosen to forgo store-bought prepared pet foods in favor of preparing food from ingredients at home. The popularity of books on home preparation of pet foods has rocketed on Amazon.com. Some veterinarians have pointed out that animal diets are difficult to maintain in terms of nutritional appropriateness and safety, and are best served by store-bought preparations, an assertion disputed by some practitioners of home-made animal foods.

== Industry and government response ==
American and Chinese authorities investigated the source of the contamination linked to pet deaths, and Chinese authorities closed down Xuzhou Anying Biologic Technology Development Company and Binzhou Futian Biology Technology Co. Ltd., the two companies linked to the contaminated products.

In the United States, there has been extensive media coverage of the recall. There has been widespread public outrage and calls for government regulation of pet foods, which had previously been self-regulated by pet food manufacturers. The United States Senate held an oversight hearing on the matter by 12 April. The economic impact on the pet food market has been extensive, with Menu Foods alone losing at least $42 million from the recall, even without taking into account reduced sales. The several waves of recalls, many issued late on Friday evenings possibly to avoid media coverage, and the events have caused distrust in some consumers.

== Litigation ==
Many owners of pets stricken after consuming Menu Foods' product have considered filing lawsuits against the company, but are encountering difficulties with the valuation of the deceased pets. While many pet owners consider their pets to be a "part of the family", lost pets have traditionally been treated as property, with the potential liability limited to the retail value of the animal. Some states define the monetary value of a pet for litigation or insurance purposes. Other states have allowed suits for punitive damages and emotional distress suffered in the loss of a pet.

After word of the recall and reports of animal deaths began to spread, Menu Foods was served with several individual lawsuits over the deaths of affected pets. On 20 March 2007 after the death of her cat, a woman in Chicago, Illinois sued Menu Foods for negligence in delaying the recall. The same day, lawyers for a Knoxville, Tennessee woman filed suit in Federal Court against Menu Foods for $25 million and hoping to attain class action status, citing negligence in testing the food prior to distribution.

As individual lawsuits were filed across the nation, an Ontario, Oregon family filed a class-action lawsuit against Menu Foods, citing emotional damage and economic loss. The lawyers filing the federal lawsuit noted Washington state, which has jurisdiction, had a history of favorable consumer protection precedents in prior pet-related lawsuits, but finding a set value for the lost pets may be difficult.

On 23 March 2007, Menu Foods said they will reimburse pet owners who can trace their pets' illnesses to the company's products. One estimate is that the cost to owners of treating sickened pets is between $2 million and $20 million.

By 5 April 2007 the 20 March Chicago lawsuit expanded to federal class-action status, with over 200 plaintiffs seeking punitive damages for emotional distress. The plaintiffs have specifically accused Menu Foods of fraud, claiming the company may have known of a problem as early as December.

Menu Foods faces 90 class-action lawsuits as a result of the contamination. U.S. District Court Judge Hillman has ordered Menu Foods to have no contact with plaintiffs unless their attorneys are involved in the discussion, after lawyers from six firms representing pet owners claimed the company illegally attempted to contact their clients directly. Hillman has said "It seems to me that Menu Foods is out to do whatever Menu Foods wants to do in a way that could adversely impact the rights" of the plaintiffs.

== Suspected related outbreak in 2004 ==
A 2004 outbreak involving pet foods sickened more than 6,000 dogs and a lesser number of cats in Asia. Kidney failure in the animals was linked to foods manufactured in Thailand by Mars, Inc. Veterinarians in Asia initially blamed the 2004 problems on fungal toxins, but pathology tests conducted in 2007 found melamine and cyanuric acid present in renal tissue from both outbreaks. According to pathologists: "These results indicate that the pet food–associated kidney failure outbreaks in 2004 and 2007 share identical clinical, histologic, and toxicologic findings, providing compelling evidence that they share the same causation."

== See also ==
- 2007 Chinese export recalls
- 2008 Chinese milk scandal
- China compulsory certification
- Chinese protein export contamination
- Pet insurance
