= Cyanuric acid =

Chemical compound belonging to the class of triazine

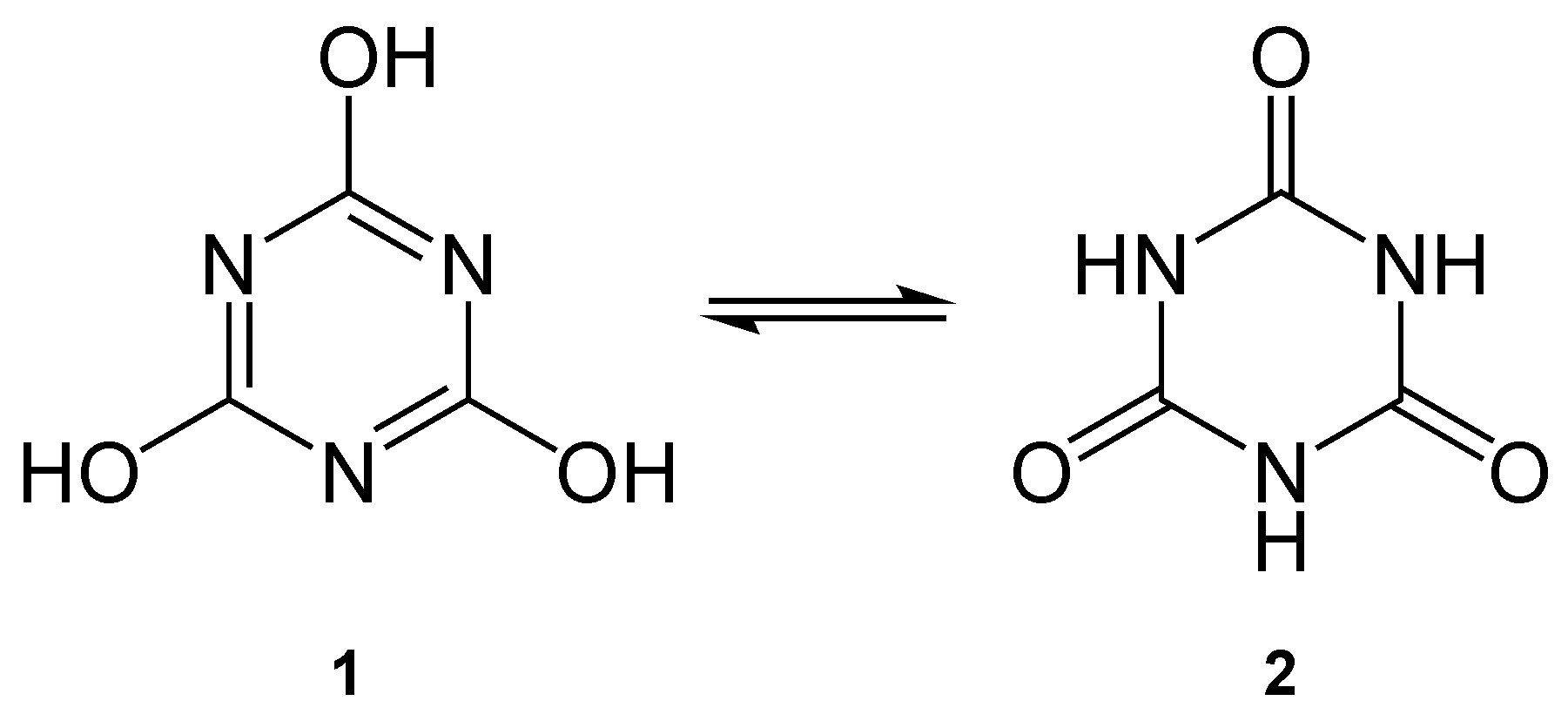
- Structural formulae of both tautomers

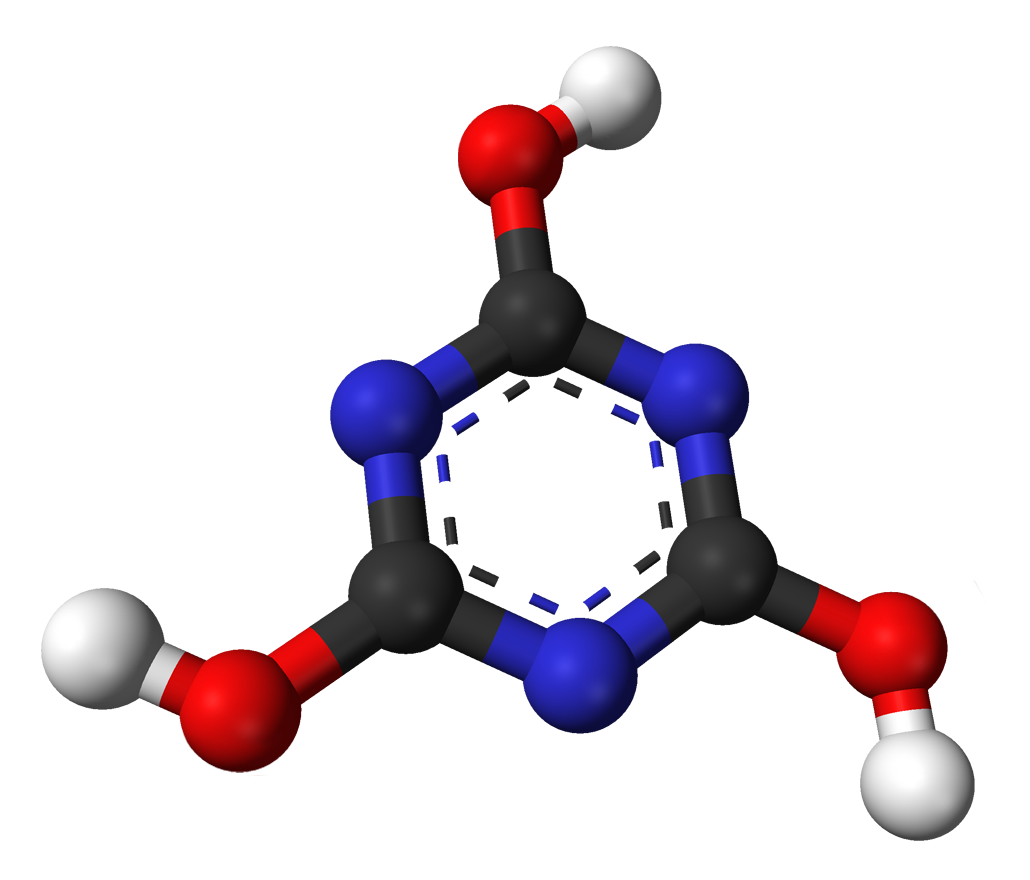
Ball-and-stick model of the triol tautomer
Cyanuric (triol) tautomer
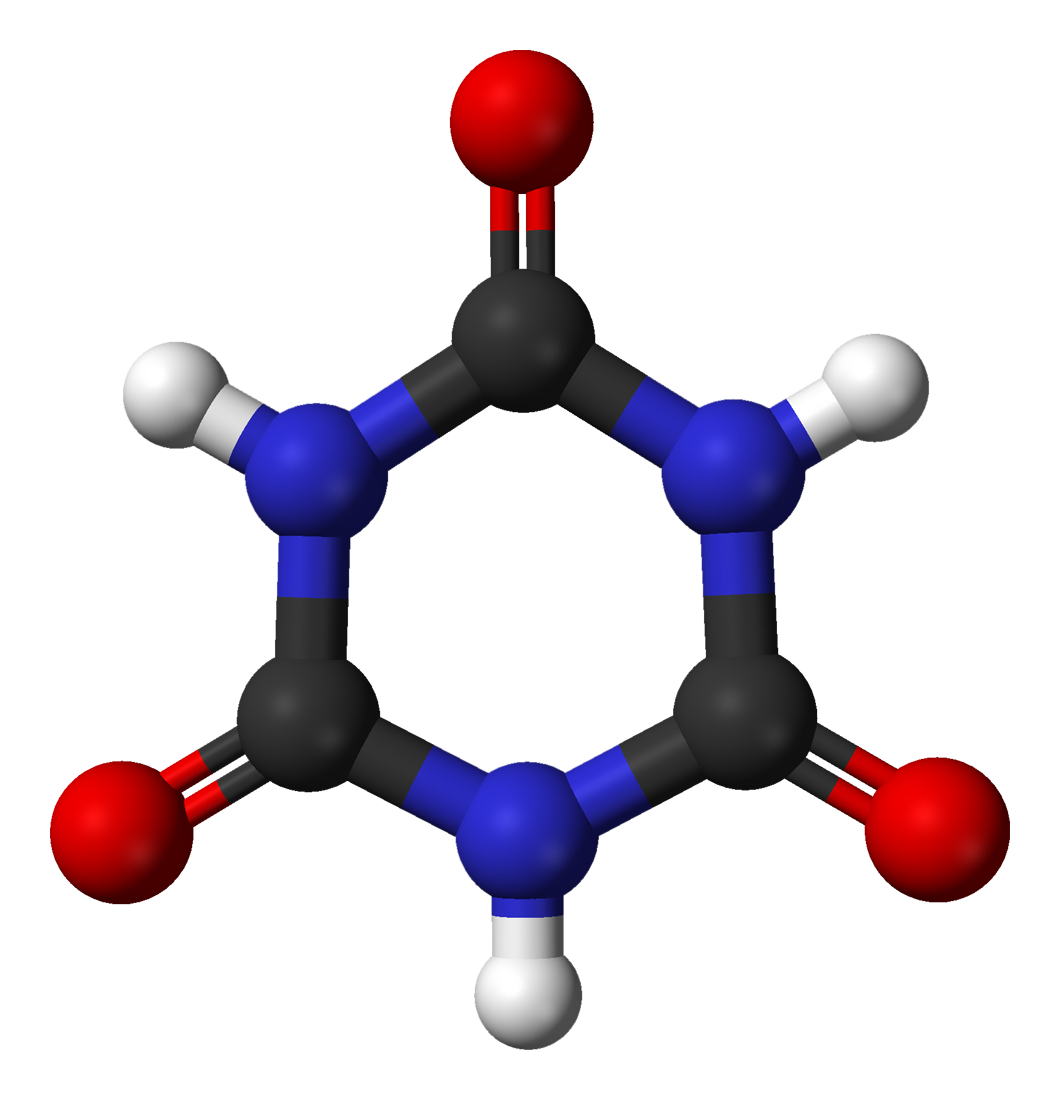
Ball-and-stick model of the trione tautomer
Isocyanuric (trione) tautomer

Names
- Preferred IUPAC name 1,3,5-Triazinane-2,4,6-trione
- Other names 1,3,5-Triazine-2,4,6(1H,3H,5H)-trione; 1,3,5-Triazinetriol s-Triazinetriol s-Triazinetrione; Tricarbimide; Isocyanuric acid Pseudocyanuric acid

Identifiers
CAS Number	108-80-5; 6202-04-6 (Dihydrate)
3D model (JSmol)	Cyanuric (triol) tautomer: Interactive image; Isocyanuric (trione) tautomer: Interactive image
ChEBI	CHEBI:17696
ChEMBL	ChEMBL243087
ChemSpider	7668
ECHA InfoCard	100.003.290
KEGG	C06554
PubChem CID	7956
RTECS number	XZ1800000
UNII	H497R4QKTZ
CompTox Dashboard (EPA)	DTXSID7024873
- InChI: InChI=1S/C3H3N3O3/c7-1-4-2(8)6-3(9)5-1/h(H3,4,5,6,7,8,9) Key: ZFSLODLOARCGLH-UHFFFAOYSA-N; InChI=1/C3H3N3O3/c7-1-4-2(8)6-3(9)5-1/h(H3,4,5,6,7,8,9) Key: ZFSLODLOARCGLH-UHFFFAOYAR
- SMILES: Cyanuric (triol) tautomer: Oc1nc(O)nc(O)n1; Isocyanuric (trione) tautomer: O=C1NC(=O)NC(=O)N1

Properties
Chemical formula	C_{3}H_{3}N_{3}O_{3}
Molar mass	129.07 g/mol
Appearance	white crystalline powder
Density	1.75 g/cm^{3}
Melting point	320–360 °C (608–680 °F; 593–633 K) decomposes
Solubility in water	2700 mg/L (25 °C)
Magnetic susceptibility (χ)	−61.5·10^{−6} cm^{3}/mol

Hazards
- GHS labelling
Pictograms	(GHS07: Exclamation mark)
Signal word	Warning
Hazard statements	H319, H335
Precautionary statements	P261, P264+P265, P271, P280, P304+P340, P305+P351+P338, P319, P337+P317, P403+P233, P405, P501
Safety data sheet (SDS)	ICSC 1313

Related compounds
Related triazines	Cyanuric fluoride Cyanuric chloride Cyanuric bromide
- Except where otherwise noted, data are given for materials in their standard state (at 25 °C [77 °F], 100 kPa). verify (what is ?) Infobox references

Cyanuric acid or 1,3,5-triazine-2,4,6-triol is a chemical compound with the formula (CNOH)_{3}. Like many industrially useful chemicals, this triazine has many synonyms. This white, odorless solid finds use as a precursor or a component of bleaches, disinfectants, and herbicides. In 1997, worldwide production was 160,000 tonnes (180,000 short tons; 350,000,000 lb).

== Properties and synthesis ==
=== Properties ===
Cyanuric acid can be viewed as the cyclic trimer of the elusive chemical species cyanic acid, HOCN. The ring can readily interconvert between several structures via lactam–lactim tautomerism. Although the triol tautomer may have aromatic character, the keto form predominates in solution. The hydroxyl (-OH) groups assume phenolic character. Deprotonation with base affords a series of cyanurate salts:

[C(O)NH]_{3} ⇌ [C(O)NH]_{2}[C(O)N]^{−} + H^{+} (pK_{a} = 6.88)
[C(O)NH]_{2}[C(O)N]^{−} ⇌ [C(O)NH][C(O)N]_{2}^{2−} + H^{+} (pK_{a} = 11.40)
[C(O)NH][C(O)N]_{2}^{2−} ⇌ [C(O)N]_{3}^{3−} + H^{+} (pK_{a} = 13.5)

Cyanuric acid is noted for its strong interaction with melamine, forming insoluble melamine cyanurate. This interaction locks the cyanuric acid into the tri-keto tautomer. Melamine cyanurate is cited as an example of supramolecular chemistry.

=== Synthesis ===
Cyanuric acid (CYA) was first synthesized by Friedrich Wöhler in 1829 by the thermal decomposition of urea and uric acid. The current industrial route to CYA entails the thermal decomposition of urea, with release of ammonia. The conversion commences at approximately 175 °C (347 °F):

3 H_{2}N-CO-NH_{2} → [C(O)NH]_{3} + 3 NH_{3}

CYA crystallizes from water as the dihydrate.

Cyanuric acid can be produced by hydrolysis of crude or waste melamine followed by crystallization. Acid waste streams from plants producing these materials contain cyanuric acid and on occasion, dissolved amino-substituted triazines, namely, ammeline, ammelide, and melamine. In one method, an ammonium sulfate solution is heated to the "boil" and treated with a stoichiometric amount of melamine, by which means the cyanuric acid present precipitates as melamine-cyanuric acid complex. The various waste streams containing cyanuric acid and amino-substituted triazines may be combined for disposal, and during upset conditions undissolved cyanuric acid may be present in the waste streams.

=== Intermediates and impurities ===
Intermediates in the dehydration include both isocyanic acid, biuret, and triuret:

H_{2}N-CO-NH_{2} → HNCO + NH_{3}
H_{2}N-CO-NH_{2} + HNCO → H_{2}N-CO-NH-CO-NH_{2}
H_{2}N-CO-NH-CO-NH_{2} + HNCO → H_{2}N-CO-NH-CO-NH-CO-NH_{2}

As temperature exceeds 190 °C (374 °F), other reactions begin to dominate the process.

The first appearance of ammeline occurs prior to 225 °C (437 °F) and is suspected also to occur from decomposition of biuret but is produced at a lower rate than that of CYA or ammelide.

3 H_{2}N-CO-NH-CO-NH_{2} → [C(O)]_{2}(CNH_{2})(NH)_{2}N + 2 NH_{3} + H_{2}O

Melamine, [C(NH_{2})N]_{3}, formation occurs between 325–350 °C (617–662 °F) and only in very small quantities.

=== N-substituted isocyanurates from isocyanates ===
N-substituted isocyanurates can be synthesised by the trimerisation of isocyanates. This is utilised industrially in the formation of polyisocyanurates.

== Applications ==
Cyanuric acid is used as a chlorine stabilizer / buffer in swimming pools. It binds to free chlorine and releases it slowly, extending the time needed to deplete each dose of sanitizer. A chemical equilibrium exists between the acid with free chlorine and its chlorinated form.

=== Precursors to chlorinated cyanurates ===
Cyanuric acid is mainly used as a precursor to N-chlorinated cyanurates, which are used to disinfect water. The dichloro derivative is prepared by direct chlorination:

[C(O)NH]_{3} + 2 Cl_{2} + 2 NaOH → [C(O)NCl]_{2}[C(O)NH] + 2 NaCl + 2 H_{2}O

This species is typically converted to its sodium salt, sodium dichloro-s-triazinetrione. Further chlorination gives trichloroisocyanuric acid, [C(O)NCl]_{3}.

These N-chloro compounds serve as disinfectants and algicides for swimming pool water. The aforementioned equilibrium stabilizes the chlorine in the pool and prevents the chlorine from being quickly consumed by sunlight.

=== Precursors to crosslinking agents ===
Because of its trifunctionality, CYA is a precursor to crosslinking agents, especially for polyurethane resins and polyisocyanurate thermoset plastics.

The experimental antineoplastic drug teroxirone (triglycidyl isocyanurate) is formed by reacting cyanuric acid with 3 equivalents of epichlorohydrin. It works by cross-linking DNA.

== Analysis ==
Testing for cyanuric acid concentration is commonly done with a turbidometric test, which uses a reagent, melamine, to precipitate the cyanuric acid. The relative turbidity of the reacted sample quantifies the CYA concentration. Referenced in 1957, this test works because melamine combines with the cyanuric acid in the water to form a fine, white precipitate of the insoluble complex melamine cyanurate that causes the water to cloud in proportion to the amount of cyanuric acid in it. More recently, a sensitive method has been developed for analysis of cyanuric acid in urine.

== Animal feed ==
FDA permits a certain amount of cyanuric acid to be present in some non-protein nitrogen (NPN) additives used in animal feed and drinking water. Cyanuric acid has been used as NPN. For example, Archer Daniels Midland manufactures an NPN supplement for cattle, which contains biuret, triuret, cyanuric acid and urea.

=== 2007 pet food recalls ===
Cyanuric acid is implicated in connection to the 2007 pet food recalls, the contamination and wide recall of many brands of cat and dog foods beginning in March 2007. Research has found evidence that cyanuric acid, a constituent of urine, together with melamine forms poorly soluble crystals which can cause kidney failure (see Analysis section above).

== Safety ==
Cyanuric acid is classified as "essentially nontoxic". The 50% oral median lethal dose (LD_{50}) is 7700 mg/kg in rats.

However, when cyanuric acid is present together with melamine (which by itself is another low-toxicity substance), it will form an insoluble and rather nephrotoxic complex, as evidenced in dogs and cats during the 2007 pet food contamination and in children during the 2008 Chinese milk scandal cases.

== Natural occurrence ==
An impure copper salt of the acid, with the formula Cu(C_{3}N_{3}O_{3}H_{2})_{2}(NH_{3})_{2}, is currently the only known isocyanurate mineral, called joanneumite. It was found in a guano deposit in Chile. It is very rare.

== See also ==
- 5,5-Dimethylhydantoin, another N-heterocyclic compound used for stabilizing halogens
