= SmartPak =

SmartPak is a business headquartered in Plymouth, Massachusetts. SmartPak was founded in 1999 by two Harvard Business School graduates, founders Becky Minard, and her husband Paal Gisholt. SmartPak provides custom-packed nutritional supplements in daily-dose packages for horses and dogs. In addition to its patented feeding system that provides convenient administration of supplements and medications, SmartPak has since expanded into selling equestrian apparel and gear, and added products for dogs, including dog supplies.

== History ==
Becky Minard got the idea for SmartPak in 1999, after recognizing that the stable where she kept her horse was having trouble keeping up with feeding and supplementation. She had asked the stable to add supplements to her horse's food to help with a degenerative eye disease he suffered from that could lead to blindness. When she discovered that her horse's supplementation was inconsistent, the stable manager explained how it was a challenge for workers to feed and keep track of multiple supplements for 30 horses. In response to this problem, Minard invented SmartPak, creating a way to preselect, premeasure, and prepackage medications and supplements for individual horses.

In October 2005, Inc. Magazine named SmartPak Equine the 106th fastest-growing business in America in its annual list of America's 500 fastest growing private businesses, marking the first time an equine business was named to the list. SmartPak has been named to the Inc. 500/5000 list nine times.

In spring 2007, SmartPak recalled its LiveSmart Weight Management Chicken and Brown Rice Dog Food after being notified by one of its suppliers that the weight-control formula might contain melamine. Certain Chinese exporters were suspected of using melamine to increase protein levels in particular pet foods. Pet food tainted with melamine was linked with making thousands of dogs and cats sick nationwide, even leading to the death of some pets that had consumed other brands of pet food.

SmartPak commissioned its own independent tests that showed the subject of its original recall did not contain melamine. However, the company issued a recall in May 2007 for its Adult Lamb and Brown Rice Dog Food. Independent testing conducted for all of its LiveSmart brands showed that this product had tested positive for melamine due to cross contamination at Chenango Valley Pet Foods, which manufactured SmartPak's brands in addition to other pet food brands.

SmartPak responded immediately by calling every customer who had ordered the affected food and informing its entire customer base of the recall by letter, email and its website. SmartPak also made changes to its already “rigorous evaluation process” for selecting vendors, by requiring notification if one of Chenango Valley's suppliers were to change vendors. The company also added another layer of chemical analysis in its testing of its finished products.

SmartPak provides several horse related videos, including a series entitled “If Horses Were People” that features horse behavior.

In late 2007, SmartPak secured a $25 million equity investment from North Bridge Growth Equity of Waltham, Massachusetts, in order to help the company expand its offerings as well as strengthen its technology and its management team. This was the fourth round of funding the company had received.

SmartPak opened its first retail outlet in 2006 in Natick, Massachusetts. In July 2014, Henry Schein, Inc. (NASDAQ: HSIC) announced that its U.S. Animal Health business, Henry Schein Animal Health, had completed its acquisition of a 60 percent ownership position in SmartPak. Ownership in the remaining 40 percent stake was held by private equity firm, Oak Hill Capital Partners and SmartPak's existing management team. The balance of the transaction was not disclosed.

SmartPak's business model was featured in the 2007 book Outsmart! How To Do What Your Competitors Can’t by Jim Champy, who most recently served as Chairman Emeritus, Consulting for Dell Services. SmartPak also was featured in the 2015 business book, Above the Noise - Creating Trust, Value & Reputation Online Using Basic Digital PR by Carrie Morgan.
