= Triuret =

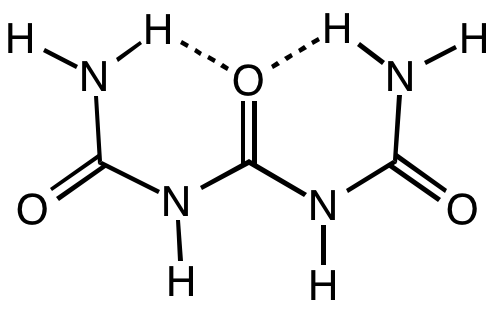
- Structure of triuret

Names
- Preferred IUPAC name 2,4-Diimidotricarbonic diamide
- Other names Carbonyldiurea; 1,3-Dicarbamylurea; Dicarbamylurea; Diimidotricarbonic diamide Tricarbonodiimidic diamide

Identifiers
CAS Number	556-99-0
3D model (JSmol)	Interactive image
ChEBI	CHEBI:36955
ChemSpider	61685
ECHA InfoCard	100.008.317
EC Number	209-147-7
MeSH	C017781
PubChem CID	68400
UNII	6ID4233C3S
CompTox Dashboard (EPA)	DTXSID9060314
- InChI: InChI=1S/C3H6N4O3/c4-1(8)6-3(10)7-2(5)9/h(H6,4,5,6,7,8,9,10) Key: WNVQBUHCOYRLPA-UHFFFAOYSA-N
- SMILES: C(=O)(N)NC(=O)NC(=O)N

Properties
Chemical formula	C_{3}H_{6}N_{4}O_{3}
Molar mass	146.106 g·mol^{−1}
Density	1.547 g/cm^{3}
- Except where otherwise noted, data are given for materials in their standard state (at 25 °C [77 °F], 100 kPa). Infobox references

Triuret is an organic compound with the formula (H_{2}NC(O)NH)_{2}CO. It is a product from the pyrolysis of urea. Triuret is a colorless, crystalline, hygroscopic solid, slightly soluble in cold water or ether, and more soluble in hot water. It is a planar molecule. The central carbonyl is hydrogen-bonded to both terminal amino groups.

== Synthesis ==
The compound is typically prepared by heating thin layers of urea, the thin layers facilitating escape of ammonia:

3 (H_{2}N)_{2}CO → [H_{2}NC(O)NH]_{2}CO + 2 NH_{3}

It can also prepared by treatment of urea with phosgene:

2 (H_{2}N)_{2}CO + COCl_{2} → [H_{2}NC(O)NH]_{2}CO + 2 HCl

A similar synthesis employs urea and dimethyl carbonate with potassium methoxide as a catalyst:

2 (H_{2}N)_{2}CO + CO(OCH_{3})_{2} → [H_{2}NC(O)NH]_{2}CO + 2 MeOH

The original synthesis entailed oxidation of uric acid with hydrogen peroxide.

Triuret is a complicating by-product in the industrial synthesis of melamine from urea.

== Related compounds ==
- Urea
- Biuret
- Cyanuric acid
