= Adulterant =

Substance that has been secretly added

An adulterant is a substance discreetly added to another that may compromise its safety or effectiveness. Consumable products, such as food, cosmetics, pharmaceuticals and fuels, are frequently adulterated to reduce the cost or difficulty of production without the knowledge of the buyer, allowing the product to be sold at the same price as a chemically pure equivalent. The adulteration of street drugs is known as lacing.

== Definition ==
Adulteration is the practice of secretly mixing a substance with another. The secretly added substance will not normally be present in any specification or declared substances due to accident or negligence rather than intent, and also for the introduction of unwanted substances after the product has been made. Adulteration, therefore, implies that the adulterant was introduced deliberately in the initial manufacturing process, or sometimes that it was present in the raw materials and should have been removed, but was not.

An adulterant is distinct from, for example, permitted food preservatives. There can be a fine line between adulterant and additive; chicory may be added to coffee to reduce the cost or achieve a desired flavor—this is adulteration if not declared on the label. Chalk was often added to bread flour; this reduces the cost and increases whiteness, but the calcium confers health benefits, and in modern bread, a little chalk may be included as an additive for this reason.

In wartime, adulterants have been added to make foodstuffs "go further" and prevent shortages. The German word ersatz is widely recognized for such practices during World War II. Such adulteration was sometimes deliberately hidden from the population to prevent loss of morale and propaganda reasons.

== In food and beverages ==
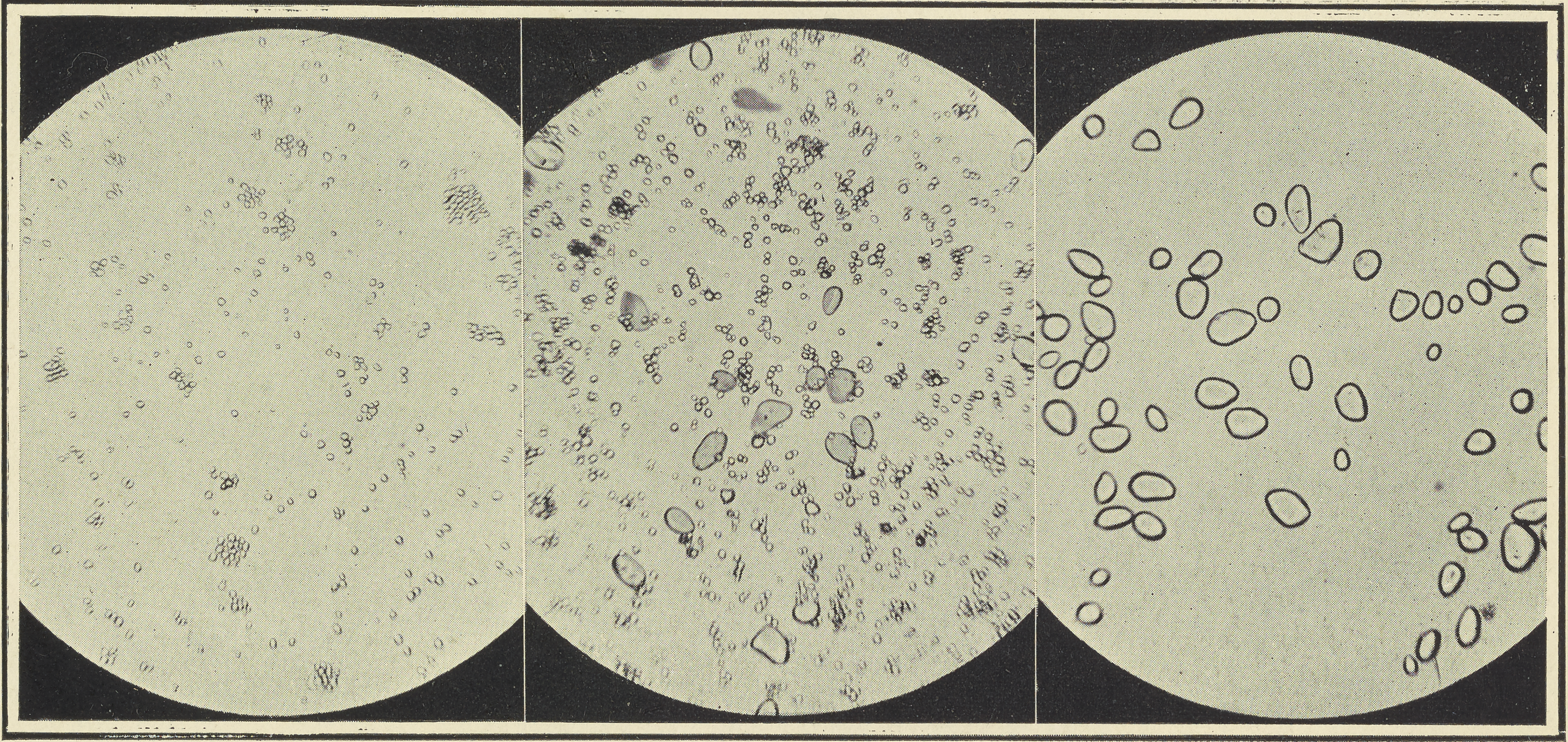
"How the microscope reveals adulteration", microscope slide comparing rice starch (left) and arrowroot (right) and a mixture of the two (center), c. 1909

Past and present examples of adulterated food, some dangerous, include:

- Apple jellies (jams), as substitutes for more expensive fruit jellies, with added colorant and sometimes even specks of wood that simulate raspberry or strawberry seeds
- High fructose corn syrup or cane sugar, used to adulterate honey
- Red ochre–soaked brown bread to give the appearance of beef sausage for sausage roll filling.
- Olive oil adulteration
- Roasted chicory roots used as an adulterant for coffee (if not mentioned or conveyed the same in any manner)
- Water, for diluting milk and alcoholic beverages
- Water or brine injected into chicken, pork, or other meats to increase their weight
- Urea, melamine and other nonprotein nitrogen sources, added to protein products to inflate crude protein content measurements

== History ==
Historically, the use of adulterants has been common; sometimes dangerous substances have been used. In the United Kingdom up to the Victorian era, adulterants were common; for example, cheeses were sometimes colored with lead. Similar adulteration issues were seen in industries in the United States, during the 19th century. There is a dispute over whether these practices declined primarily due to government regulation or to increased public awareness and concern over the practices.

In the early 21st century, cases of dangerous adulteration occurred in the People's Republic of China.

In some African countries, it is not uncommon for thieves to break electric transformers to steal transformer oil, which is then sold to the operators of roadside food stalls to be used for deep frying. When used for frying, it is reported that transformer oil lasts much longer than regular cooking oil. The downside of this misuse of the transformer oil is the threat to the health of the consumers, due to the presence of PCBs.

Adulterant use was first investigated in 1820 by the German chemist Frederick Accum, who identified many toxic metal colorings in food and drink. His work antagonized food suppliers, and he was ultimately discredited by a scandal over his alleged mutilation of books in the Royal Institution library. The physician Arthur Hill Hassall conducted extensive studies in the early 1850s, which were published in The Lancet and led to the Adulteration of Food and Drink Act 1860 (23 & 24 Vict. c. 84) and other legislation. John Postgate led a further campaign, leading to the Sale of Food and Drugs Act 1875 (38 & 39 Vict. c. 63), which forms the basis of the modern legislation and a system of public analyst who test for adulteration.

At the turn of the 20th century, industrialization in the United States led to an increase in adulteration, which inspired some protest. Accounts of adulteration led the New York Evening Post to parody:

Mary had a little lamb,
And when she saw it sicken,
She shipped it off to Packingtown,
And now it's labeled chicken.

== Incidents ==
- In 1981, denaturated colza oil was added to olive oil in Spain and 600 people were killed (see Toxic oil syndrome).
- In 1987, Beech-Nut was fined for violating the US Federal Food, Drug, and Cosmetic Act by selling flavored sugar water as apple juice.
- In 1997, ConAgra Foods illegally sprayed water on stored grain to increase its weight.
- In 2007, samples of wheat gluten mixed with melamine, presumably to produce inflated results from tests for protein content, were discovered in the USA. They were found to have come from China.
- In the 2008 Chinese milk scandal, significant portions of China's milk supply were found to have been adulterated with melamine. Infant formula produced from this milk killed at least six children and is believed to have harmed two hundred thousand children.
- In 2012, a study in India across 29 states and union territories found that milk was adulterated with detergent, fat, and even urea, and diluted with water. Just 31.5% of samples conformed to FSSAI standards.
- In the 2013 meat adulteration scandal in Europe, horse meat was passed off as beef.
- In 2019, it was discovered that lead chromate was widely added to turmeric sold in Bangladesh to enhance its yellow color, which was largely responsible for consistently high lead poisoning rates in the country and prompted a government crackdown. By 2021, the practice had been eradicated in the country, and blood lead levels had dropped.

== See also ==
- Anthropogenic hazard
- Surrogate alcohol: harmful substances which are used as substitutes for alcoholic beverages
  - Denatured alcohol: alcohol which is deliberately poisoned to discourage its recreational use
- Impurity
- Fake food
- Cutting agent
