= Cyromazine =

Names
- IUPAC name N-Cyclopropyl-1,3,5-triazine-2,4,6-triamine
- Other names Citation; Larvadex; Trigard; Vetrazin

Identifiers
CAS Number	66215-27-8
3D model (JSmol)	Interactive image
ChEMBL	ChEMBL1231107
ChemSpider	43550
ECHA InfoCard	100.060.215
KEGG	D07767
PubChem CID	47866
UNII	CA49Y29RA9
CompTox Dashboard (EPA)	DTXSID6023999
- InChI: InChI=1S/C6H10N6/c7-4-10-5(8)12-6(11-4)9-3-1-2-3/h3H,1-2H2,(H5,7,8,9,10,11,12) Key: LVQDKIWDGQRHTE-UHFFFAOYSA-N; InChI=1/C6H10N6/c7-4-10-5(8)12-6(11-4)9-3-1-2-3/h3H,1-2H2,(H5,7,8,9,10,11,12) Key: LVQDKIWDGQRHTE-UHFFFAOYAC
- SMILES: Nc1nc(N)nc(NC2CC2)n1

Properties
Chemical formula	C_{6}H_{10}N_{6}
Molar mass	166.19 g/mol
Appearance	Crystalline
Melting point	219 to 222 °C (426 to 432 °F; 492 to 495 K)
- Except where otherwise noted, data are given for materials in their standard state (at 25 °C [77 °F], 100 kPa). verify (what is ?) Infobox references

Cyromazine is a triazine insect growth regulator used as an insecticide to control dipterans and some other insects. It is a cyclopropyl derivative of melamine. The exact mechanism of action of cyromazine against insects is unclear although it does affect the larval and pupal cuticles.

In veterinary medicine, cyromazine is used as an ectoparasiticide. It has been used since 1979 in Australia and New Zealand to control and prevent flystrike of sheep by blowfly. The exact mechanism of action has not been determined, but it is non-toxic to mammals and does not target the nervous system. It is not toxic to adult flies, only having its effect on larval forms by disrupting the moulting process. It can give 8-10 weeks protection when applied topically. Because of this it has little effect on existing infestations and is commonly used prophylactically. In 2011 resistance was detected in Lucilia cuprina to cyromazine from infested sheep that failed to be protected following treatment.

== Regulation ==
The Food Safety and Inspection Service (FSIS) of the United States Department of Agriculture (USDA) provides a test method for analyzing cyromazine and melamine in animal tissues in its Chemistry Laboratory Guidebook which "contains test methods used by FSIS Laboratories to support the Agency's inspection program, ensuring that meat, poultry, and egg products are safe, wholesome and accurately labeled." In 1999, in a proposed rule published in the Federal Register regarding cyromazine residue, the United States Environmental Protection Agency (EPA) proposed "remov[ing] melamine, a metabolite of cyromazine from the tolerance expression since it is no longer considered a residue of concern."
