= Melamine =

Fire-resistant chemical used in dinnerware, insulation, and cleaning products

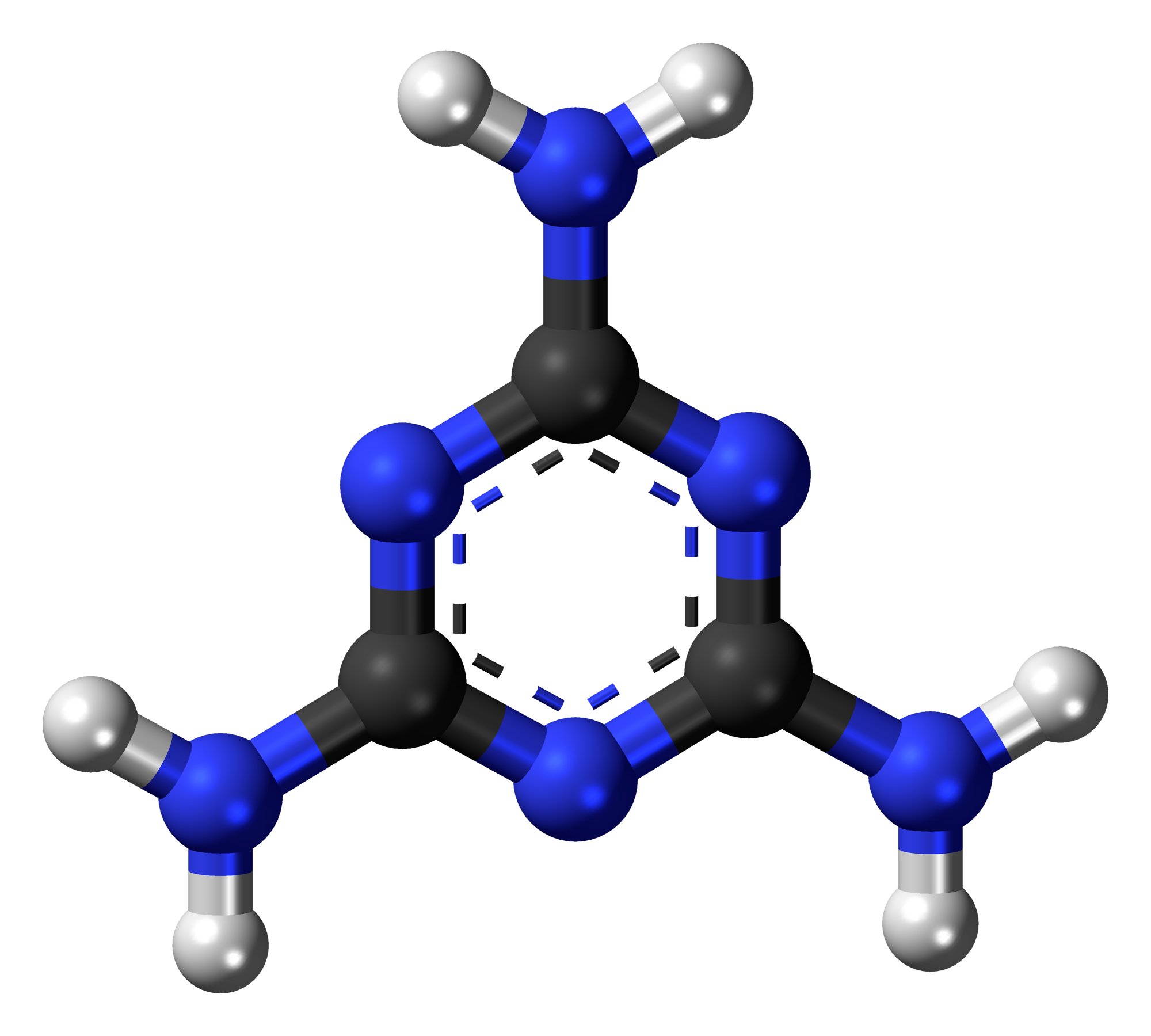

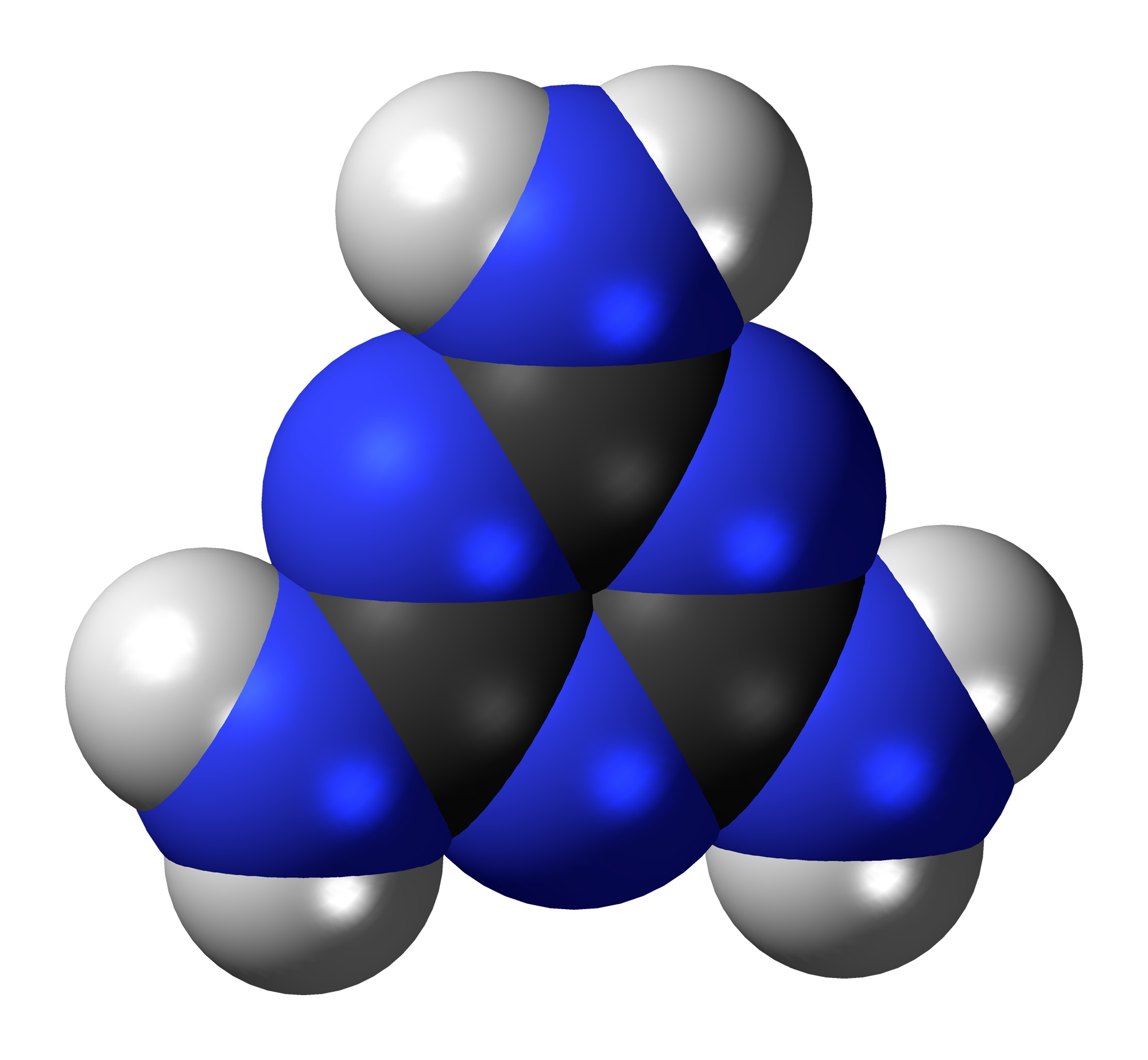

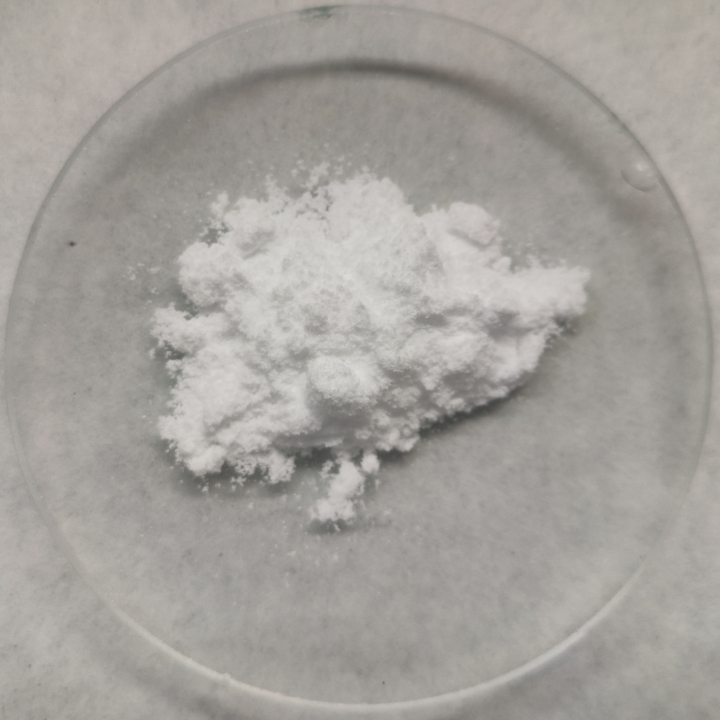

Names
- Preferred IUPAC name 1,3,5-Triazine-2,4,6-triamine
- Other names 2,4,6-Triamino-s-triazine; Cyanurotriamide; Cyanurotriamine; Cyanuramide

Identifiers
CAS Number	108-78-1
3D model (JSmol)	Interactive image
ChEBI	CHEBI:27915
ChemSpider	7667
ECHA InfoCard	100.003.288
KEGG	C08737
PubChem CID	7955
UNII	N3GP2YSD88
CompTox Dashboard (EPA)	DTXSID6020802
- InChI: InChI=1S/C3H6N6/c4-1-7-2(5)9-3(6)8-1/h(H6,4,5,6,7,8,9) Key: JDSHMPZPIAZGSV-UHFFFAOYSA-N; InChI=1/C3H6N6/c4-1-7-2(5)9-3(6)8-1/h(H6,4,5,6,7,8,9) Key: JDSHMPZPIAZGSV-UHFFFAOYAF
- SMILES: Nc1nc(N)nc(N)n1

Properties
Chemical formula	C_{3}H_{6}N_{6}
Molar mass	126.123 g·mol^{−1}
Appearance	White solid
Density	1.573 g/cm^{3}
Melting point	343 °C (649 °F; 616 K) (decomposition)
Boiling point	Sublimes
Solubility in water	3240 mg/ L (20 °C)
Solubility	very slightly soluble in hot alcohol, benzene, glycerol, pyridine insoluble in ether, benzene, CCl_{4}
log P	−1.37
Acidity (pK_{a})	5.0 (conjugated acid)
Basicity (pK_{b})	9.0
Magnetic susceptibility (χ)	−61.8·10^{−6} cm^{3}/mol
Refractive index (n_{D})	1.872

Structure
Crystal structure	Monoclinic

Thermochemistry
Std enthalpy of combustion (Δ_{c}H^{⦵}_{298})	−1967 kJ/mol

Hazards
- GHS labelling
Pictograms	(GHS08: Health hazard)
Signal word	Warning
Hazard statements	H351, H373
Precautionary statements	P203, P260, P280, P318, P319, P405, P501
Autoignition temperature	500 °C (932 °F; 773 K)
- Lethal dose or concentration (LD, LC)
LD_{50} (median dose)	3850 mg/kg (rat, oral)
- Except where otherwise noted, data are given for materials in their standard state (at 25 °C [77 °F], 100 kPa). verify (what is ?) Infobox references

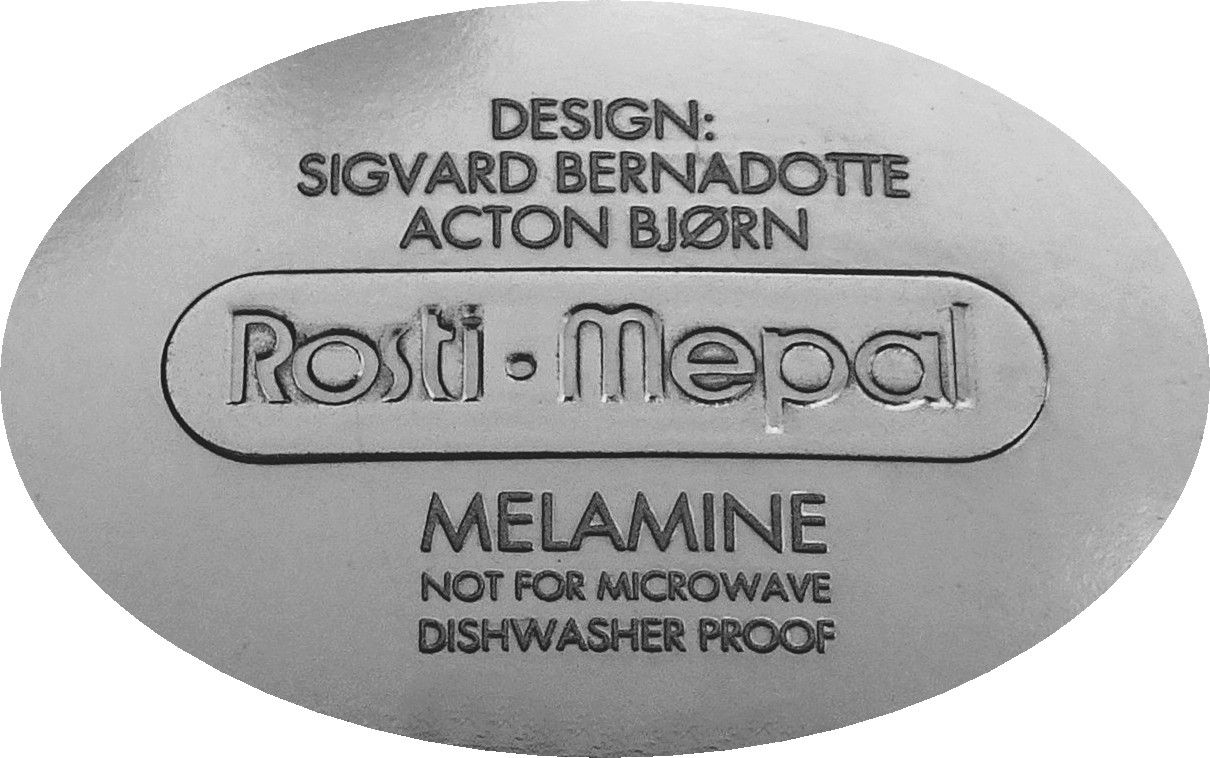
Marking of product made of Melamine

Melamine /ˈmɛləmiːn/ is an organic compound with the formula C_{3}H_{6}N_{6}. This white solid is a trimer of cyanamide, with a 1,3,5-triazine skeleton. Like cyanamide, it contains 66% nitrogen by mass, and its derivatives have fire-retardant properties due to its release of nitrogen gas when burned or charred. Melamine can be combined with formaldehyde and other agents to produce melamine resins. Such resins are characteristically durable thermosetting plastic used in high-pressure decorative laminates such as Formica, melamine dinnerware including cooking utensils, plates, and plastic products, laminate flooring, and dry erase boards. Melamine foam is used as insulation and soundproofing material, and in polymeric cleaning products such as Magic Eraser.

Melamine gained infamy when Chinese food producers Sanlu Group added it to baby formula in order to increase the apparent protein content, causing the 2008 Chinese milk scandal. Ingestion of melamine may lead to reproductive damage, or bladder or kidney stones, and bladder cancer. It is also an irritant when inhaled or in contact with the skin or eyes. The United Nations' food standards body, the Codex Alimentarius Commission, has set the maximum amount of melamine allowed in powdered infant formula to 1 mg/kg and the amount of the chemical allowed in other foods and animal feed to 2.5 mg/kg. While not legally binding, the levels allow countries to ban importation of products with excessive levels of melamine.

== Etymology ==
The German word Melamin was coined by combining the words melam (a derivative of ammonium thiocyanate) and amine.

== History ==
Melamine was first synthesized in 1834 by Justus von Liebig.

== Uses ==
=== Plastics and building materials ===
In one large-scale application, melamine is combined with formaldehyde and other agents to produce melamine resins. Such resins are characteristically durable thermosetting plastic used in high-pressure decorative laminates such as Wilsonart, melamine dinnerware, laminate flooring, and dry erase boards. Melamine cookware is not microwave-safe, and can be identified from the fact it is "slightly heavier and noticeably thicker than its plastic counterparts."

Melamine foam is used as insulation, soundproofing material and in polymeric cleaning products, such as Magic Eraser.

Melamine is one of the major components in Pigment Yellow 150, a colorant in inks and plastics.

Melamine also is used in the fabrication of melamine polysulfonate, used as a superplasticizer for making high-resistance concrete. Sulfonated melamine formaldehyde (SMF) is a polymer used as a cement admixture to reduce the water content in concrete while increasing the fluidity and the workability of the mix during handling and pouring. It results in concrete with a lower porosity and a higher mechanical strength, exhibiting an improved resistance to aggressive environments and a longer lifetime.

=== Fertilizers ===
Melamine was once envisioned as fertilizer for crops during the 1950s and 1960s because of its high (66% by mass) nitrogen content. However, melamine is much more expensive to produce than other common nitrogen fertilizers, such as urea. The mineralization (degradation to ammonia) for melamine is slow, making this product both economically and scientifically impractical for use as a fertilizer.

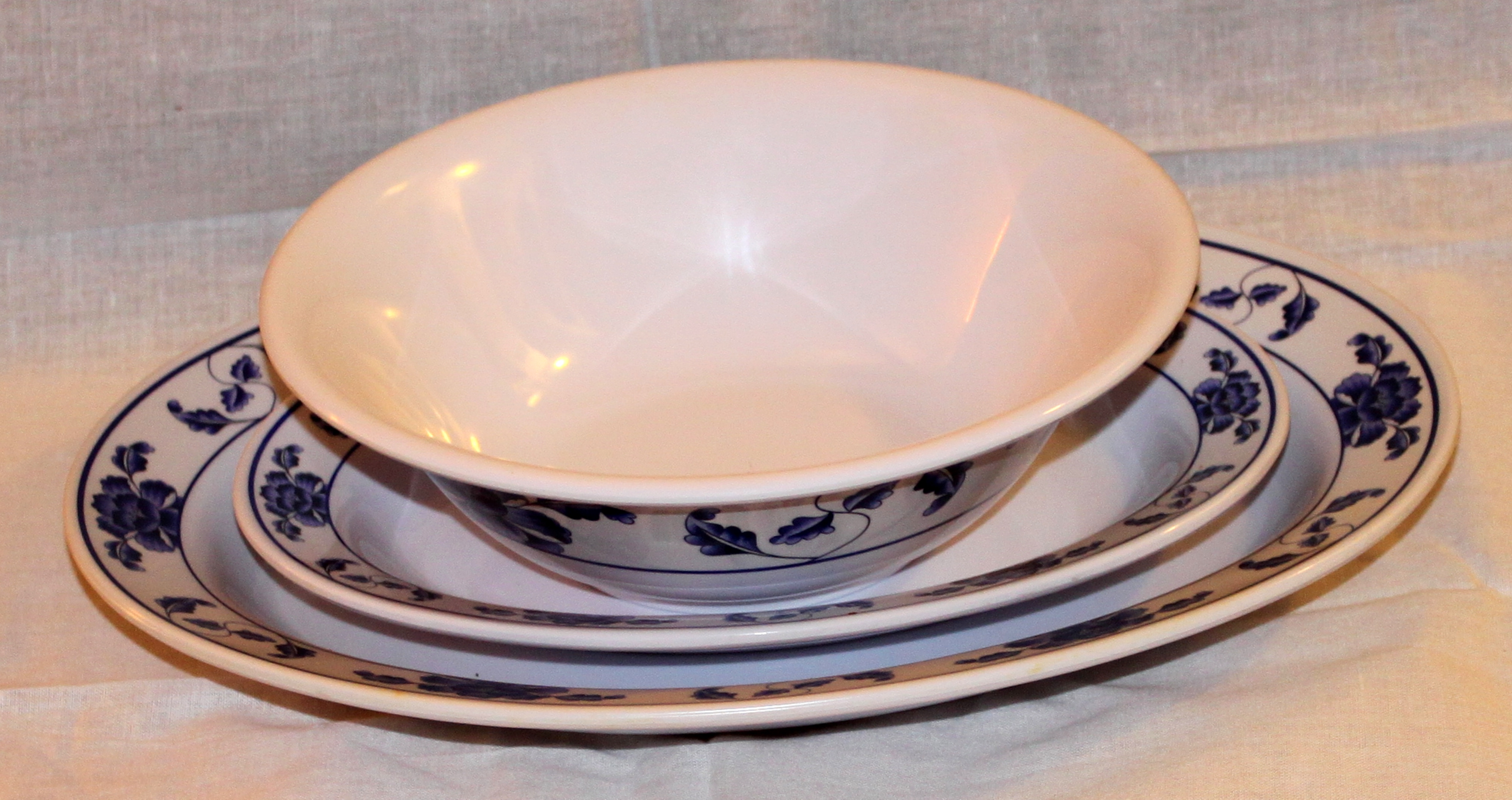
Melamine dinnerware

=== Fire-retardant additives ===
Melamine and its salts are used as fire-retardant additives in paints, plastics, and paper. A melamine fiber, Basofil, has low thermal conductivity, excellent flame resistance and is self-extinguishing; this makes it useful for flame-resistant protective clothing, either alone or as a blend with other fibres.

=== Food adulterant ===
Melamine is sometimes illegally added to food products in order to increase the apparent protein content. Standard tests, such as the Kjeldahl and Dumas tests, estimate protein levels by measuring the nitrogen content, so they can be misled by the addition of nitrogen-rich, but non-proteinaceous compounds such as melamine. There are instruments available today that can differentiate melamine nitrogen from protein nitrogen.

=== Medicine ===
Melamine derivatives of arsenical drugs are potentially important in the treatment of African trypanosomiasis.

Melamine use as non-protein nitrogen (NPN) for cattle was described in a 1958 patent. In 1978, however, a study concluded that melamine "may not be an acceptable non-protein N source for ruminants" because its hydrolysis in cattle is slower and less complete than other nitrogen sources such as cottonseed meal and urea.

== Toxicity ==
The short-term lethal dose of melamine is on a par with common table salt, with an LD_{50} of more than 3 grams per kilogram of bodyweight. U.S. Food and Drug Administration (FDA) scientists explained that when melamine and cyanuric acid are absorbed into the bloodstream, they concentrate and interact in the urine-filled renal tubules, then crystallize and form large numbers of round, yellow crystals, which in turn block and damage the renal cells that line the tubes, causing the kidneys to malfunction and lead to kidney stones, kidney failure, and death. Signs of melamine toxicity can include irritability, blood in the urine, little to no urine, symptoms of kidney infection, or high blood pressure.

The European Union set a standard for acceptable human consumption (tolerable daily intake or TDI) of melamine at 0.2 mg per kilogram of body mass (previously 0.5 mg/kg), Canada declared a limit of 0.35 mg/kg, and the US FDA's limit was put at 0.063 mg/kg (previously 0.63 mg/kg). The World Health Organization's food safety director estimated that the amount of melamine a person could stand per day without incurring a bigger health risk, the TDI, was 0.2 mg per kilogram of body mass.

Toxicity of melamine can be mediated by intestinal microbiota. In culture, Raoultella terrigena, which rarely colonizes mammalian intestines, was shown to convert melamine to cyanuric acid directly. Rats colonized by R. terrigena showed greater melamine-induced kidney damage compared to those not colonized.

=== Acute toxicity ===
Melamine is reported to have an oral median lethal dose (LD_{50}) of 3248 mg/kg based on rat data. It is also an irritant when inhaled or in contact with the skin or eyes. The reported dermal LD_{50} is greater than 1000 mg/kg for rabbits. A study by Soviet researchers in the 1980s suggested that melamine cyanurate, commonly used as a fire retardant, could be more toxic than either melamine or cyanuric acid alone. For rats and mice, the reported LD_{50} for melamine cyanurate was 4.1 g/kg (given inside the stomach) and 3.5 g/kg (via inhalation), compared to 6.0 and 4.3 g/kg for melamine and 7.7 and 3.4 g/kg for cyanuric acid respectively.

A toxicology study in animals conducted after recalls of contaminated pet food concluded that the combination of melamine and cyanuric acid in diet does lead to acute kidney injury in cats. A 2008 study produced similar experimental results in rats and characterized the melamine and cyanuric acid in contaminated pet food from the 2007 outbreak. A 2010 study from Lanzhou University attributed kidney failure in humans to uric acid stone accumulation after ingestion of melamine resulting in a rapid aggregation of metabolites such as cyanuric acid diamide (ammeline) and cyanuric acid. A 2013 study demonstrated that melamine can be metabolized to cyanuric acid by gut bacteria. In particular, Klebsiella terrigena was determined to be a factor in melamine toxicity. In culture, K. terrigena was shown to convert melamine to cyanuric acid directly. Cyanuric acid was detected in the kidneys of rats administered melamine alone, and the concentration after Klebsiella colonization was increased.

=== Chronic toxicity ===
Ingestion of melamine may lead to reproductive damage, or bladder or kidney stones, which can lead to bladder cancer.

A study in 1953 reported that dogs fed 3% melamine for a year had the following changes in their urine: (1) reduced specific gravity, (2) increased output, (3) melamine crystalluria, and (4) protein and occult blood.

A survey commissioned by the American Association of Veterinary Laboratory Diagnosticians suggested that crystals formed in the kidneys when melamine combined with cyanuric acid, "don't dissolve easily. They go away slowly, if at all, so there is the potential for chronic toxicity."

=== Metabolism ===
Melamine is a metabolite of cyromazine, a pesticide. It has been reported that cyromazine can also be converted to melamine in plants.

=== Treatment of urolithiasis ===
Fast diagnosis and treatment of acute obstructive urolithiasis may prevent the development of acute kidney failure. Urine alkalinization and stone liberalization have been reported to be the most effective treatments in humans.

=== Contamination ===
Melamine-formaldehyde resin tableware was evaluated by the Taiwan Consumers' Foundation to have 20 parts per million of free melamine that could migrate out of the plastic into acidic foods if held at 160 °F (71 °C) for two hours, such as if food were kept heated in contact with it in an oven.

== Regulation in food and feed ==
The United Nations' food standards body, Codex Alimentarius Commission, has set the maximum amount of melamine allowed in powdered infant formula to 1 mg/kg and the amount of the chemical allowed in other foods and animal feed to 2.5 mg/kg. While not legally binding, the levels allow countries to ban importation of products with excessive levels of melamine.

== Synthesis and reactions ==
Melamine was first synthesized by the German chemist Justus von Liebig in 1834. In early production, first calcium cyanamide was converted into dicyandiamide, which was heated above its melting temperature to produce melamine. Today most industrial manufacturers use urea in the following reaction to produce melamine:

6 (NH_{2})_{2}CO → C_{3}H_{6}N_{6} + 6 NH_{3} + 3 CO_{2}

In the first step, urea decomposes into cyanic acid and ammonia:

(NH_{2})_{2}CO → HNCO + NH_{3}

Cyanic acid polymerizes to cyanuric acid, which condenses with the liberated ammonia forming melamine. The released water reacts with cyanic acid, which helps to drive the reaction:

6 HNCO + 3 NH_{3} → C_{3}H_{6}N_{6} + 3 CO_{2} + 3 NH_{3}

The above reaction can be carried out by either of two methods: catalyzed gas-phase production or high pressure liquid-phase production. In one method, molten urea is introduced onto a fluidized bed with catalyst for reaction. Hot ammonia gas is also present to fluidize the bed and inhibit deammonization. The effluent then is cooled. Ammonia and carbon dioxide in the off-gas are separated from the melamine-containing slurry. The slurry is further concentrated and crystallized to yield melamine. Major manufacturers and licensors such as Orascom Construction Industries, BASF, and Eurotecnica have developed some proprietary methods.

The off-gas contains large amounts of ammonia. Therefore, melamine production is often integrated into urea production, which uses ammonia as feedstock.

Crystallization and washing of melamine generates a considerable amount of waste water, which may be concentrated into a solid (1.5–5% of the weight) for easier disposal. The solid may contain approximately 70% melamine, 23% oxytriazines (ammeline, ammelide, and cyanuric acid), 0.7% polycondensates (melem, melam, and melon). In the Eurotecnica process, however, there is no solid waste and the contaminants are decomposed to ammonia and carbon dioxide and sent as off gas to the upstream urea plant; accordingly, the waste water can be recycled to the melamine plant itself or used as clean cooling water make-up.

Melamine reacts with acid and related compounds to form melamine cyanurate and related crystal structures, which have been implicated as contaminants or biomarkers in Chinese protein adulterations.

== Drug derivatives ==
Melamine is part of the core structure for a number of drugs including almitrine, altretamine, cyromazine, ethylhexyl triazone, iscotrizinol, meladrazine, melarsomine, melarsoprol, tretamine, trinitrotriazine, and others.

== Production in mainland China ==
Between the late 1990s and early 2000s, both consumption and production of melamine grew considerably in mainland China. By early 2006, melamine production in mainland China is reported to be in "serious surplus". Between 2002 and 2007, while the global melamine price remained stable, a steep increase in the price of urea (feedstock for melamine) has reduced the profitability of melamine manufacturing. Currently, China is the world's largest exporter of melamine, while its domestic consumption still grows by 10% per year. However, reduced profit has already caused other joint melamine ventures to be postponed there.

Surplus melamine has been an adulterant for feedstock and milk in mainland China for several years now because it can make diluted or poor quality material appear to be higher in protein content by elevating the total nitrogen content detected by some simple protein tests. Actions taken in 2008 by the Government of China have reduced the practice of adulteration, with the goal of eliminating it. As a result of the Chinese milk scandal, court trials began in December 2008 for six people involved in adding melamine in food products, ending in January 2009 with two of the convicts being sentenced to death and executed.

== Melamine poisoning by tainted food ==
Melamine has been involved in several food recalls after the discovery of severe kidney damage to children and pets poisoned by melamine-adulterated food.

=== 2007 animal-feed recalls ===
In 2007, a pet food recall was initiated by Menu Foods and other pet food manufacturers who had found their products had been contaminated and caused serious illnesses or deaths in some of the animals that had eaten them. In March 2007, the US Food and Drug Administration reported finding white granular melamine in the pet food, in samples of white granular wheat gluten imported from a single source in China, Xuzhou Anying Biologic Technology as well as in crystalline form in the kidneys and in urine of affected animals. Further vegetable protein imported from China was later implicated.

In April 2007, The New York Times reported that the addition of "melamine scrap" into fish and livestock feed to give the false appearance of a higher level of protein was an "open secret" in many parts of mainland China, reporting that this melamine scrap was being produced by at least one plant processing coal into melamine. Four days later, the New York Times reported that, despite the widely reported ban on melamine use in vegetable proteins in mainland China, at least some chemical manufacturers continued to report selling it for use in animal feed and in products for human consumption. Li Xiuping, a manager at Henan Xinxiang Huaxing Chemical in Henan Province, stated, "Our chemical products are mostly used for additives, not for animal feed. Melamine is mainly used in the chemical industry, but it can also be used in making cakes." Shandong Mingshui Great Chemical Group, the company reported by the New York Times as producing melamine from coal, produces and sells both urea and melamine but does not list melamine resin as a product.

Another recall incident in 2007 involved melamine which had been purposely added as a binder to fish and livestock feed manufactured in the United States. This was traced to suppliers in Ohio and Colorado.

=== 2008 Chinese outbreak ===
In September 2008, several companies, including Nestlé, were implicated in a scandal involving milk and infant formula which had been adulterated with melamine, leading to kidney stones and other kidney failure, especially among young children. By December 2008, nearly 300,000 people had become ill, with more than 50,000 infant hospitalizations and six infant deaths. In a study published in the New England Journal of Medicine, it was reported that melamine exposure increased the incidence of urinary tract stones by seven times in children. Melamine may have been added to fool government protein content tests after water was added to fraudulently dilute the milk. Because of melamine's high nitrogen content (66% by mass versus approximately 10–12% for typical protein), it can cause the protein content of food to appear higher than the true value. Officials estimate that about 20% of the dairy companies tested in China sell products tainted with melamine. On January 22, 2009, three of those involved in the scandal (including one conditional sentence) were sentenced to death in a Chinese court.

In October 2008, "Select Fresh Brown Eggs" exported to Hong Kong from the Hanwei Group in Dalian in northeastern China were found to be contaminated with nearly twice the legal limit of melamine. York Chow, the health secretary of Hong Kong, said he thought animal feeds might be the source of the contamination and announced that the Hong Kong Centre for Food Safety would henceforward be testing all mainland Chinese pork, farmed fish, animal feed, chicken meat, eggs, and offal products for melamine.

As of July 2010, Chinese authorities were still reporting some seizures of melamine-contaminated dairy product in some provinces, though it was unclear whether these new contaminations constituted wholly new adulterations or were the result of illegal reuse of material from the 2008 adulterations.

On characterization and treatment of urinary stones in affected infants, The New England Journal of Medicine printed an editorial in March 2009, along with reports on cases from Beijing, Hong Kong and Taipei.

Urinary calculi specimens were collected from 15 cases treated in Beijing and were analyzed as unknown objects for their components at Beijing Institute of Microchemistry using infrared spectroscopy, nuclear magnetic resonance, and high performance liquid chromatography. The result of the analysis showed that the calculus was composed of melamine and uric acid, and the molecular ratio of uric acid to melamine was around 2:1.

In a 2009 study of 683 children diagnosed in Beijing in 2008 with nephrolithiasis and 6,498 children without nephrolithiasis aged < 3 years, investigators found that in children exposed to melamine levels < 0.2 mg/kg per day, the risk for nephrolithiasis was 1.7 times higher than in those without melamine exposure, suggesting that the risk of melamine-induced nephrolithiasis in young children starts at a lower intake level than the levels recommended by the World Health Organization.

In a study published in 2010, researchers from Beijing University studying ultrasound images of infants who fell ill in the 2008 contamination found that while most children in a rural Chinese area recovered, 12 per cent still showed kidney abnormalities six months later. "The potential for long-term complications after exposure to melamine remains a serious concern," the report said. "Our results suggest a need for further follow-up of affected children to evaluate the possible long-term impact on health, including renal function." Another 2010 follow-up study from Lanzhou University attributed the uric acid stone accumulation after ingestion of melamine to a rapid aggradation of metabolites such as cyanuric acid diamide (ammeline) and cyanuric acid and reported that urine alkalinization and stone liberalization were the most effective treatments.

Until the 2007 pet food recalls, melamine had not routinely been monitored in food, except in the context of plastic safety or insecticide residue.

Following the deaths of children in China from powdered milk in 2008, the Joint Research Centre (JRC) of the European Commission in Belgium set up a website about methods to detect melamine. In May 2009, the JRC published the results of a study that benchmarked the ability of labs around the world to accurately measure melamine in food. The study concluded that the majority of labs can effectively detect melamine in food.

In October 2008, the U.S. Food and Drug Administration (FDA) issued new methods for the analysis of melamine and cyanuric acid in infant formulations in the Laboratory Information Bulletin No 4421. Similar recommendations have been issued by other authorities, like the Japanese Ministry of Health, Labor and Welfare, both based on liquid chromatography – mass spectrometry (LC/MS) detection after hydrophilic interaction liquid chromatography (HILIC) separation.

The existing methods for melamine determination using a triple quadrupole liquid chromatography – mass spectrometry (LC/MS) after solid phase extraction (SPE) are often complex and time-consuming. However, electrospray ionization methods coupled with mass spectrometry allow a rapid and direct analysis of samples with complex matrices: the native liquid samples are directly ionized under ambient conditions in their original solution. In December 2008, two new fast and inexpensive methods for detecting melamine in liquids have been published.

Ultrasound-assisted extractive electrospray ionization mass spectrometry (EESI-MS) has been developed at ETH Zurich (Switzerland) by Zhu, Chingin et al., (2008) for a rapid detection of melamine in untreated food samples. Ultrasounds are used to nebulize the melamine-containing liquids into a fine spray. The spray is then ionised by extractive electrospray ionisation (EESI) and analysed using tandem mass spectrometry (MS/MS). An analysis requires 30 seconds per sample. The limit of detection of melamine is a few nanograms of melamine per gram of milk.

Huang et al. (2008) have also developed at Purdue University (US) a simpler instrumentation and a faster method by using a low-temperature plasma probe to ionize the samples. The major obstacles being solved, the ESI-MS technique allows now high-throughput analysis of melamine traces in complex mixtures.

The Melaminometer was a hypothetical design for a synthetic biology circuit, to be used for detecting melamine and related chemical analogues such as cyanuric acid. The conceptual project is hosted at OpenWetWare as open source biology in collaboration with DIYbio and has been discussed in various newspapers in the context of homebrew biotechnology. As of October 2009, the design has not been verified.

Because melamine resin is often used in food packaging and tableware, melamine at ppm level (1 part per million) in food and beverage has been reported due to migration from melamine-containing resins. Small amounts of melamine have also been reported in foodstuff as a metabolite product of cyromazine, an insecticide used on animals and crops.

The Food Safety and Inspection Service (FSIS) of the United States Department of Agriculture (USDA) provides a test method for analyzing cyromazine and melamine in animal tissues. In 2007, the FDA began using a high performance liquid chromatography test to determine the melamine, ammeline, ammelide, and cyanuric acid contamination in food. Another procedure is based on surface-enhanced Raman spectroscopy (SERS).

Member states of the European Union are required under Commission Decision 2008/757/EC to ensure that all composite products containing at least 15% of milk product, originating from China, are systematically tested before import into the Community and that all such products which are shown to contain melamine in excess of 2.5 mg/kg are immediately destroyed.

Following the 2008 melamine milk scandal, China restructured its food safety system by implementing the Food Safety Law, introducing stricter dairy industry regulations, and establishing independent third-party inspections to strengthen oversight and restore public trust. The 2009 Food Safety Law also reorganized government oversight by placing food safety regulation under a uniform national framework that employs risk-based standards and adheres to international Codex Alimentarius Commission guidelines.

== Detection in biological specimens ==
The presence of melamine in urine specimens from children who consumed adulterated milk products has been determined by liquid chromatography-mass spectrometry.

== Melamine on metal surfaces ==
It is reported that melamine molecules adsorbed on gold or silver surface tend to arrange into honeycomb or closed-packed structures. Such a self-assembly occurs due to the inter-molecular hydrogen bond interaction. This ordering was further investigated using classical Monte Carlo and DFT methods.

== See also ==
- Zhao Lianhai
