= Melamine foam =

Microporous polymer foam with multiple applications

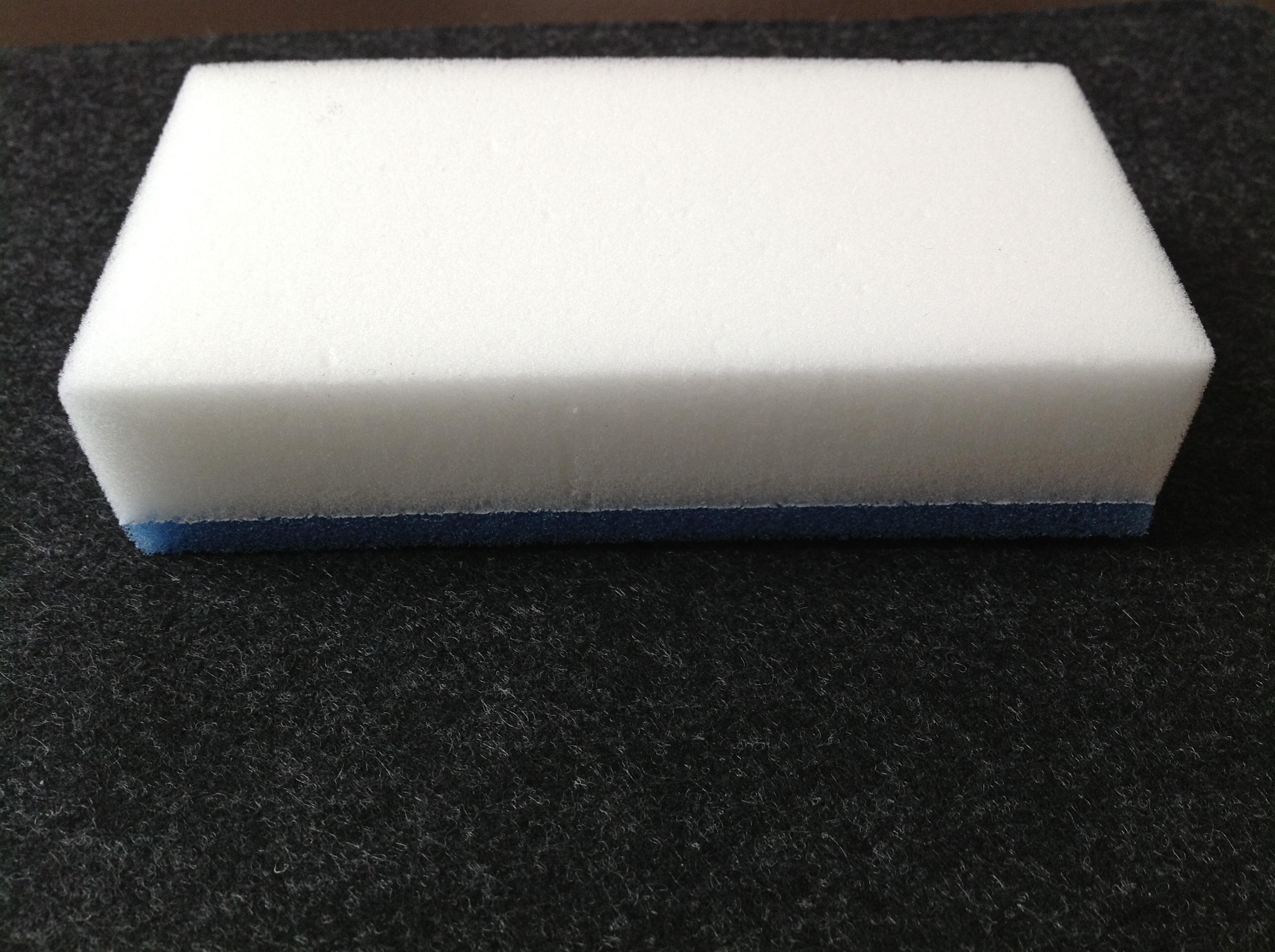
A "Mr. Clean Magic Eraser" brand sponge, made from melamine foam

Melamine foam is a foam-like material consisting of a melamine-formaldehyde condensate. It is the active component of a number of abrasive cleaner sponges, notably the Magic Eraser.

In 1984, BASF launched the first commercially produced melamine resin foam, Basotect, which was originally marketed as a flame-retardant solution for soundproofing and thermal insulation in construction.

== Properties ==
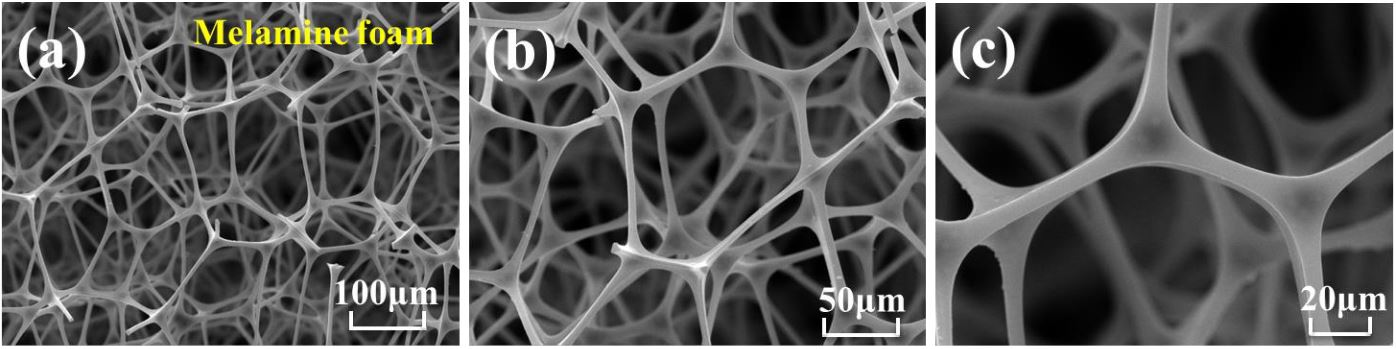
Images from a scanning electron microscope showing melamine foam's microscopic interconnected porous structure

The open-cell foam is microporous and its polymeric substance is very hard, so that when used for cleaning it works like extremely fine sandpaper, getting into tiny grooves and pits in the object being cleaned.

On a larger scale, the material feels soft because the reticulated foam bubbles interconnect. Its structure is a 3D network of very hard strands, when compared to the array of separate bubbles in a material such as styrofoam.

Being microporous, it also effectively absorbs sound waves.

Being open-cell, it entrains countless air bubbles, giving it low thermal conductivity and thereby making it an effective insulator.

== Production ==
Melamine foam is produced through a two-stage process: resin synthesis and curing foaming. The synthesis of melamine resin begins by dissolving melamine and formaldehyde in a weakly alkaline solution, maintained at a pH between 8.5 and 9.0, to prevent the formation of insoluble methylene melamine precipitate. This mixture then undergoes an addition reaction at 80–90°C, forming hydroxymethyl melamine. Subsequently, hydroxymethyl melamine undergoes poly-condensation in a neutral or weakly alkaline medium, yielding melamine resin linked by dimethylene ether or methylene bonds. The second stage, curing foaming, involves thoroughly mixing the melamine resin with an emulsifier, curing agent, and foaming agent. This mixture is then subjected to cross-linking via microwave or oven heating, which forms the final polymer foam with a three-dimensional network structure.

== Uses ==
=== Cleaning ===
In the early 21st century, it was discovered that melamine foam is an effective abrasive cleaner, and the first Mr. Clean Magic Eraser was released in 2003. Rubbing with a slightly moistened foam may remove otherwise "uncleanable" external markings from surfaces. For example, melamine foam can remove crayon, marker pen, and grease from painted walls and wood finishings, plastic-adhering paints from treated wooden tables, and adhesive residue and grime from hubcaps. If the surface being cleaned is not sufficiently hard, it may be finely scratched by the melamine material. Similarly to a pencil eraser, the foam wears away during use, leaving behind a slight residue which can be rinsed off. The foam residue contributes to the cleaning as an abrasive and is a microplastic that may become a pollutant.

=== Other uses ===
Naturally lightweight, melamine foam is also used as insulation for pipes and ductwork, and as a soundproofing material for studios, sound stages, auditoriums, and the like. One advantage of melamine foam over other soundproofing materials is that it's considered not flammable. Melamine foam’s fire rating is Class A/Class 1 in the United States and ULCS-102 for Canada. If heated to 465 °F (241 °C), the foam shrinks, and collapses. These properties suit it as the main sound and thermal insulation material for Shinkansen bullet trains.

== See also ==
- Melamine resin
