= Ammeline =

Structural formula
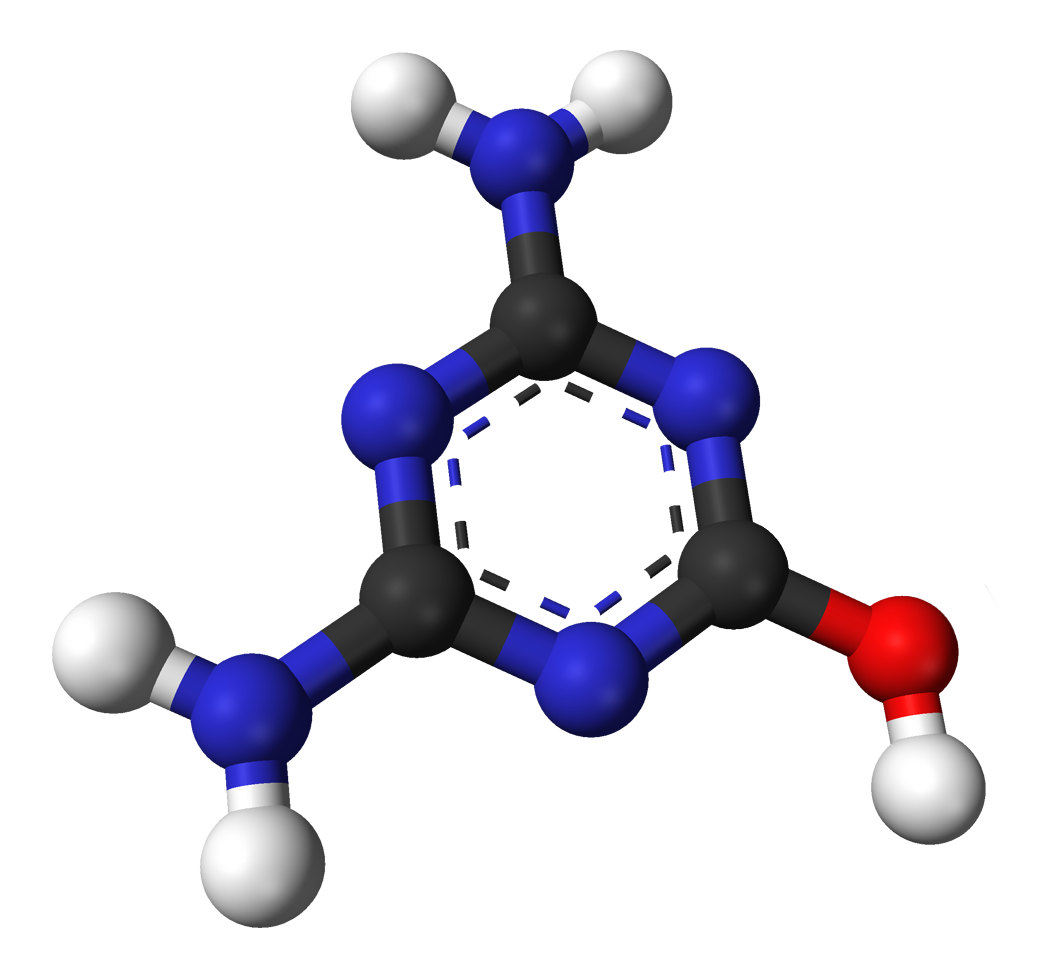
Ball-and-stick model

Names
- Preferred IUPAC name 4,6-Diamino-1,3,5-triazin-2-ol
- Other names 2,4-Diamino-6-hydroxy-1,3,5-triazine; 4,6-Diamino-2-hydroxy-1,3,5-triazine; 4,6-diamino-1,3,5-triazin-2(1H)-one

Identifiers
CAS Number	645-92-1
3D model (JSmol)	Interactive image
ChEBI	CHEBI:28646
ChemSpider	12063
ECHA InfoCard	100.010.415
KEGG	C08733
PubChem CID	12583
UNII	LC8G9556Q0
CompTox Dashboard (EPA)	DTXSID3060950
- InChI: InChI=1S/C3H5N5O/c4-1-6-2(5)8-3(9)7-1/h(H5,4,5,6,7,8,9) Key: MASBWURJQFFLOO-UHFFFAOYSA-N; InChI=1/C3H5N5O/c4-1-6-2(5)8-3(9)7-1/h(H5,4,5,6,7,8,9) Key: MASBWURJQFFLOO-UHFFFAOYAL
- SMILES: O=C\1/N=C(/N)NC(=N/1)/N

Properties
Chemical formula	C_{3}H_{5}N_{5}O
Molar mass	127.107 g·mol^{−1}
Appearance	White powder
Melting point	N/A (decomposes before melting)
Solubility in water	Trace
Solubility	Soluble in aqueous alkalies and mineral acids, but not acetic acid
- Except where otherwise noted, data are given for materials in their standard state (at 25 °C [77 °F], 100 kPa). verify (what is ?) Infobox references

Ammeline (4,6-diamino-2-hydroxy-1,3,5-triazine) is a triazine derivative. It is the hydrolysis product of melamine.

== Synthesis ==
Ammeline can be synthesized by the pyrolysis of urea or the condensation reaction among 2 moles of dicyandiamide and 1 mole of biuret.

2 C_{2}H_{4}N_{4} + C_{2}H_{5}N_{3}O_{2} → 2C_{3}H_{5}N_{5}O + NH_{3}

== Chemical properties ==
Ammeline is weakly acidic with pKa ~9. It can form nitrate, sulfate, chromate, and oxalate salts. Ammeline reacts with boiling dilute hydrochloric acid to form melem and ammonia.

Ammeline is the first step in melamine hydrolysis. Further hydrolysis (e.g. boiling ammeline with dilute alkali) yields ammelide.
