= Timeline of the 2008 Chinese milk scandal =

This timeline of the 2008 Chinese milk scandal documents how events related to the Chinese dairy products contamination by melamine unfolded. Complaints about kidney problems traced back to a brand of infant formula, subsequent discoveries of melamine contamination of liquid milk, and exported powdered milk of processed food products (using contaminated milk). The scandal decimated Chinese dairy exports, and re-exposed long-standing concerns about food security, corruption, lack of political checks and balances. Though the scandal came to attention in 2008, its roots can be traced back to events prior to 2008.

== 2007 ==
- December: According to the Xinhua News Agency, Sanlu received the first complaints about its baby milk.

== 2008 ==
Screen grab of query 6021-28494 to the AQSIQ

- 16 July: Gansu Province reports to the Ministry of Health that local hospitals had identified an increase in the incidence of kidney ailments among babies in the months earlier, and that most victims had consumed Sanlu's baby formula.
- 24 July: The bulletin board of the General Administration of Quality Supervision, Inspection and Quarantine (AQSIQ) indicated a rare occurrence of kidney stones in children – all causally traced to Sanlu milk formula – was flagged by a urologist in a paediatric hospital
- 2 August: Fonterra became aware of Sanlu melamine contamination
- 11 August: Memo allegedly from PR agency dated this day, suggesting paying Baidu ¥3 million to censor negative news. The memo starts circulating on the internet within days.
- 5 September: Fonterra notified the New Zealand government
- 8 September: the New Zealand Prime Minister Helen Clark notified Beijing officials alerted directly
- 11 September: A Dongfang Zaobao reporter, Jian Guangzhou, reported the connection between Sanlu's baby formula and infant kidney stones to the Chinese public. This was the first time that Sanlu was identified as being responsible for the cases on a public media; the Ministry of Health confirmed the report in a press briefing that evening; World Health Organisation notified
- 12 September: USFDA Issues Health Information Advisory on Infant Formula; Sanlu Group admits that its powdered milk was contaminated with melamine.
- 13 September: Production halted at Sanlu; nineteen people are arrested; Baidu denies ever agreeing to bury Sanlu negative news
- 15 September: Beijing confirms two babies dead. Vice-President of the Sanlu Group apologises to the public.
- 16 September: Powdered milk from 22 Chinese companies tested positive for melamine, Sanlu tops the rankings
- 17 September: MD of Sanlu is detained on criminal charges; Shijiazhuang Mayor Ji Chuntang resigns; Health Minister Chen Zhu declares toll of "more than 6,200 children, and that more than 1,300 others, mostly newborns, remain hospitalised with 158 suffering from acute kidney failure"
- 18 September: China revokes 'Inspection-Free' right of top dairy companies; Yili products recalled in Hong Kong after testing positive for melamine
- 19 September: Melamine found in ordinary milk from three well-known dairies. One of the firms involved – Mengniu dairy issues blanket recall on all its products.
- 21 September: additional Hong Kong victim diagnosed; Chinese premier Wen Jiabao makes a PR visit to sick infants; Nestlé pure milk contaminated, Taiwan's Mr. Brown Coffee is recalled following discovery of contamination
- 22 September: Toll of ill babies rises to 53,000, and the death toll to at least four; Li Changjiang, minister in charge of the AQSIQ, is forced to resign after the State Council publishes inquest concluded that he was responsible for the "negligence in supervision"; Local Party Secretary Wu Xianguo is dismissed; Taiwan bans Chinese milk products
- 23 September: Other countries start to test Chinese dairy products or remove them from shops; Malaysia bans Chinese milk candies, chocolate; Tanzania suspends milk imports from China; Two new HK victims diagnosed; scare widens to cake, sweets; toll of victims mount to 54,000 children, 4 dead
- 24 September: 3 more children in HK and Macau sick; Indonesia bans Chinese milk imports; Tesco withdraws White Rabbit Creamy Candies
- 25 September: South Korea bans Chinese food; two-year-old girl is first suspected victim in Taiwan; Vietnam bans milk imported from China; The EU bans Chinese baby food with milk traces. Sales of White Rabbit Creamy Candy are halted after tests detect melamine.
- 26 September: Chile withdraws Chinese dairy products; India bans Chinese dairy products for 3 months; Taiwan reports 5 new melamine victims; Taiwanese Health minister resigns over melamine tolerance levels
- 27 September: Hong Kong finds traces of melamine in HJ Heinz baby food; Indonesia finds melamine in M&M's and Snickers (Mars Incorporated) and Oreos (Nabisco)
- 29 September: Cadbury recalls products in Asia after tests find traces of melamine. Reports say 22 people have been arrested in Hebei province, suspected of introducing melamine into the supply chain.
- 30 September: Koala's March Cookies with melamine found in Netherlands; Lipton milk tea powder recalled in Hong Kong; melamine found in 31 milk batches tested by AQSIQ
- 2 October: Parents file lawsuit in China against Sanlu
- 7 October: Six more detained over melamine
- 8 October: PRC govt said it would no longer issue updated figures "because it is not an infectious disease"; Reuters compiled figures reported by local media across the country, and said the toll stood at nearly 94,000 at the end of September
- 10 October: Slovakia finds melamine in chocolate snacks; Three milk program girls in Macau diagnosed with kidney stones
- 14 October: China orders the withdrawal of all milk produced more than a month earlier
- 15 October: Seventh kidney stone case diagnosed in Hong Kong
- 16 October: Eighth kidney stone case diagnosed in Hong Kong; Italy seizes smuggled Chinese milk; Malaysia discovers impure ammonium bicarbonate responsible for biscuit contamination

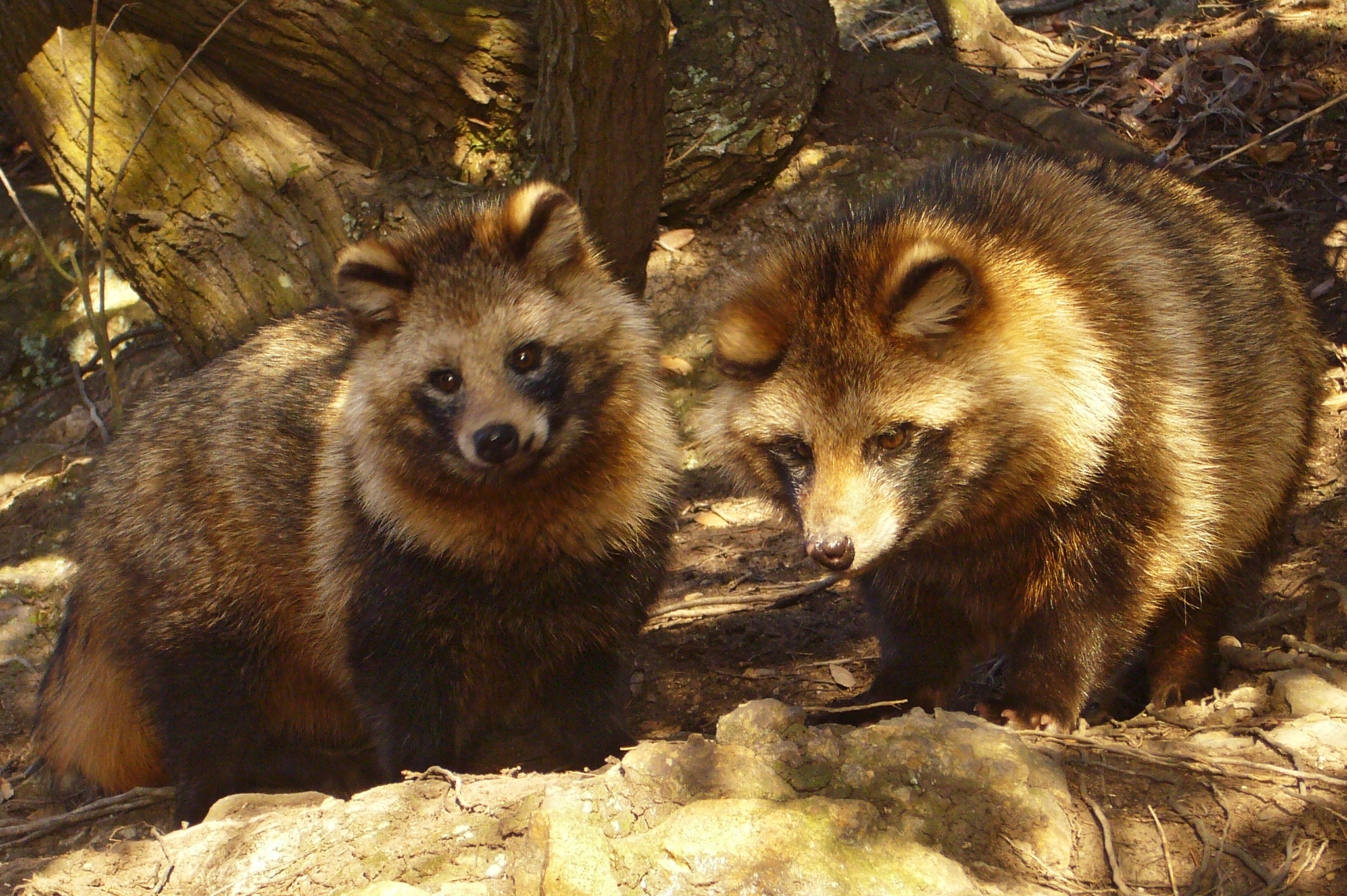
Raccoon dogs

- 18 October: Japan finds melamine in powdered eggs
- 19 October: Taiwanese authorities detected melamine in 469 tons of baking ammonia imported from China
- 21 October: About 1,500 raccoon dogs bred for their fur on a farm in China die of kidney failure after eating feed tainted with melamine.
- 22 October: Hong Kong scientists find excessive levels of melamine in a brand of mainland eggs; S Korea finds melamine in Chinese powdered eggs
- 23 October: Six more people are arrested in connection with the tainted milk scandal.

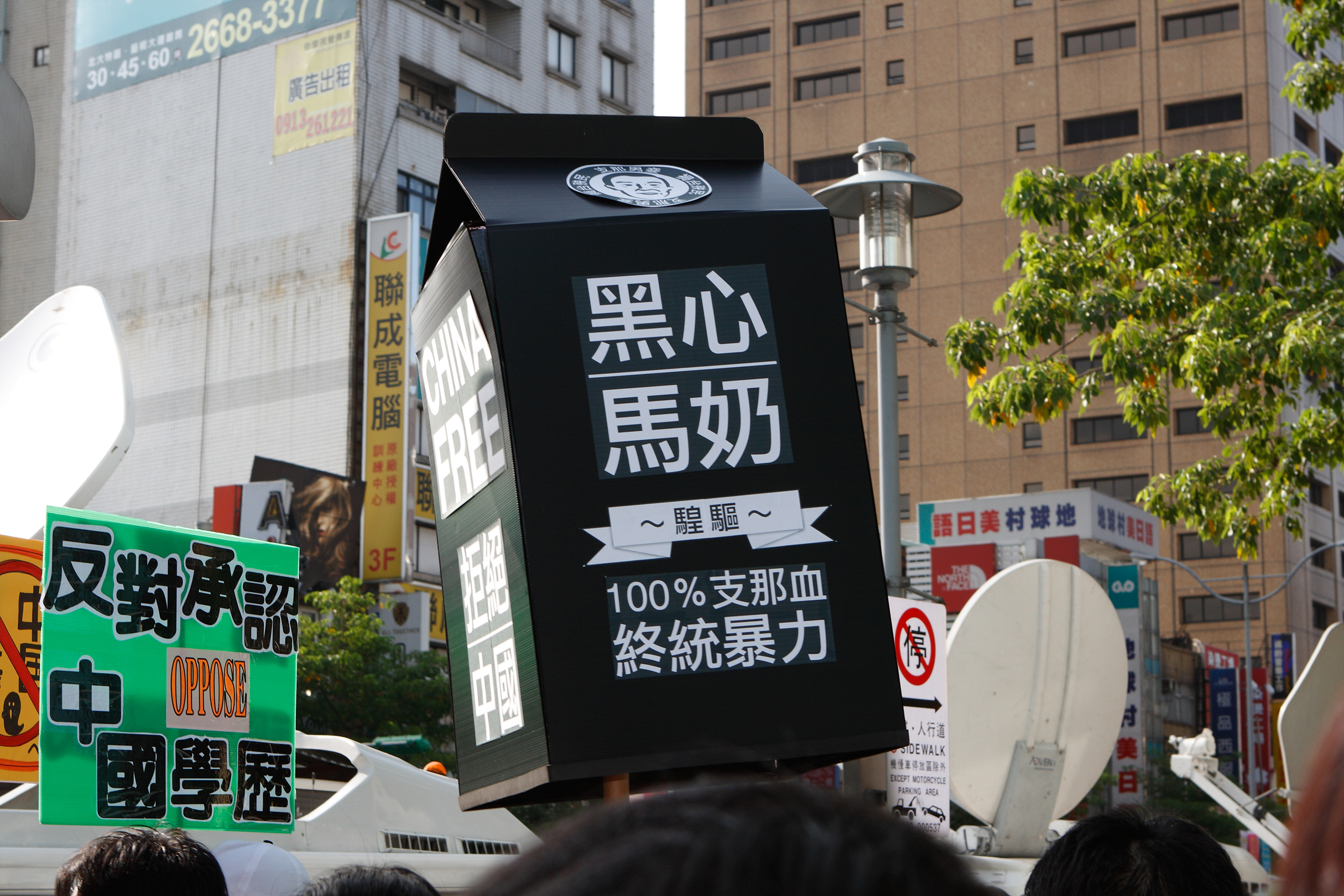
Anti-China demonstration in Taiwan

- 25 October: Anti-China rally in Taiwan
- 26 October: Hong Kong authorities discover eggs produced by Dalian Hanwei Group containing melamine.
- 29 October: Two more egg brands from Shanxi and Hubei provinces are found to contain melamine.
- 31 October: Lawsuits against Sanlu put on hold by officials; State media admit that melamine is probably being routinely added to Chinese animal feed.
- 2 November: A Chinese official insists the egg scandal is isolated case, and clamps down on illegal producers of feed.
- 1 December: Ministry of Health revises number of victims to more than 290,000, 51,900 hospitalised; 3 deaths officially confirmed (out of 11 deaths reported from provinces).
- 10 December: Ministry of Health announces 22 million children examined for kidney problems since September; MoH also stated compensation plan for victims under review.
- 25 December: Shijiazhuang court accepted a creditor's bankruptcy petition against Sanlu.
- 26 December: Shijiazhuang court charged six people in connection with melamine adulteration, of which two of "endangering public security". Four others were charged in other Hebei courts.
- 29 December:1,500 boxes of melamine-contaminated Silang House of Steamed Potato Crackers destined for Hong Kong were seized and destroyed.
- 31 December: Tian Wenhua, former general manager of Sanlu, and three other company executives appeared in court in Shijiazhuang, charged with producing and selling milk contaminated with melamine.

== 2009 ==
- 2 January A group of parents whose children fell ill from contaminated milk held a news conference to draw attention to the plight of their sick children; five were detained by police, and were taken to a labour camp outside Beijing.
- 22 January China begins sentencing those involved in the scandal. The former boss of Sanlu, Tian Wenhua, was sentenced to life imprisonment along with three others, while two men, Zhang Yujun and Geng Jinping, were sentenced to death. Wenhua was also ordered to pay a fine of 20 million yuan ($2.9 million). Sanlu was fined 50 million yuan ($7.3 million) although it has been declared bankrupt.
- 24 November: Zhang Yujun and Geng Jinping are executed.

== See also ==
- Official test failures of the 2008 Chinese milk scandal
- 2007 Chinese export recalls
- Timeline of the 2007 pet food recalls
- Chinese protein export contamination
