= Zheng Xiaoyu =

Chinese official executed for corruption (1944–2007)

Director of the State Food and Drug Administration
- In office May 2003 – June 2005
- Preceded by: Himself (as Director of the State Drug Administration)
- Succeeded by: Shao Mingli

Director of the State Drug Administration
- In office 1998–2003
- Preceded by: Office established
- Succeeded by: Himself (as Director of the State Food and Drug Administration)

Personal details
- Born: Chinese: 郑筱萸; pinyin: Zhèng Xiǎoyú; December 10, 1944 Fuzhou, Fujian, China
- Died: July 10, 2007 (aged 62) China
- Party: Chinese Communist Party
- Education: Fudan University
- Known for: Taking bribes and dereliction of duty
- Criminal information
- Status: Executed by lethal injection
- Convictions: Corruption; Dereliction of duty
- Penalty: Death

Zheng Xiaoyu (Chinese: 郑筱萸; pinyin: Zhèng Xiǎoyú; December 10, 1944 – July 10, 2007) was the director of the State Food and Drug Administration of the People's Republic of China from 2003 to 2005. He was sentenced to death for corruption and allowing possibly tainted products in mainland China in the first instance trial at Beijing No.1 Intermediate Court on May 29, 2007. He was executed on July 10, 2007.

== Biography ==
Born in Fuzhou, Fujian, in 1944, Zheng Xiaoyu received his bachelor's degree in biology from Fudan University in 1968. He joined the Chinese Communist Party in November 1979.

Zheng was the director of the State Pharmaceutical Administration from 1994 to 1998, the first head of the State Drug Administration, which he had successfully lobbied for its establishment, from 1998 to 2003, and director of the State Food and Drug Administration from 2003 to 2005.

In May 2007, Zheng was convicted of taking bribes and dereliction of duty and sentenced to death by a trial court in Beijing. He had taken bribes totaling more than 6.49 million RMB (or a rough equivalent of 850,000 USD) from eight pharmaceutical companies in exchange for personally approving unproven and unsafe medicines while working as the head of China's ministry of food and drug safety. These approvals caused the deaths of over 800 people in Panama from cough syrup that contained diethylene glycol in place of glycerin. It was also discovered that during the eight-year period of drug oversight, Zheng personally ordered approvals of more than 150,000 new medicines, a number 134-times that of the U.S. FDA (which approves, on average, ca. 140 new medicines annually). Most of those 150,000 medicines were the products of the eight pharmaceutical companies that bribed Zheng. A single unsafe medication of Anhui Huayuan (华源) Worldbest Biology Pharmacy, since closed, resulted in 14 patient deaths, hundreds being permanently disabled, and several thousand more falling seriously ill; Anhui Huayuan's CEO committed suicide before his arrest. Zheng's trial resulted in a death sentence. He was also ordered to forfeit all of his property.

Cao Wenzhuang, a former director of the same agency's department dealing with drug registrations was also sentenced to death in the first week of July 2007, for dereliction of duty and accepting bribes. Cao had accepted more than two million RMB (or a rough equivalent of 250,000 USD). Cao received a two-year "reprieve" for his death sentence, "a ruling that usually [results in the death sentence being] commuted to life in prison if the convict is deemed to have reformed." Cao's death sentence was reduced to life in prison in 2009, then further reduced to 14 years and three months after he repaid 1.15 million in yuan.

Zheng entered an appeal for leniency on June 12, saying that the sentence was "too severe" citing the fact that he had confessed his crimes and cooperated with investigators. However, the court ruled that while these were indeed mitigating factors, his crimes were far too serious to warrant leniency, and he was a "great danger" to the country and its reputation. The appeal was rejected on June 22 and he was executed on July 10, 2007. Lethal injection was used for the execution. In a note written before his execution, Zheng said he was sorry for what he had done.

== See also ==
- 2007 Chinese export recalls
- 2007 pet food recalls
- Timeline of the 2007 pet food recalls
- Gu (poison)
- Gu Kailai
- Protein adulteration in China
- 2008 Chinese milk scandal
- Official test failures of the 2008 Chinese milk scandal
- Timeline of the 2008 Chinese milk scandal
- Cheng Kejie

== Notes ==
Government offices
Preceded by New title	Head of State Food and Drug Administration of China; 2003 – 2005	Succeeded by Shao Mingli
