= 2008 Chinese milk scandal =

Food safety crisis

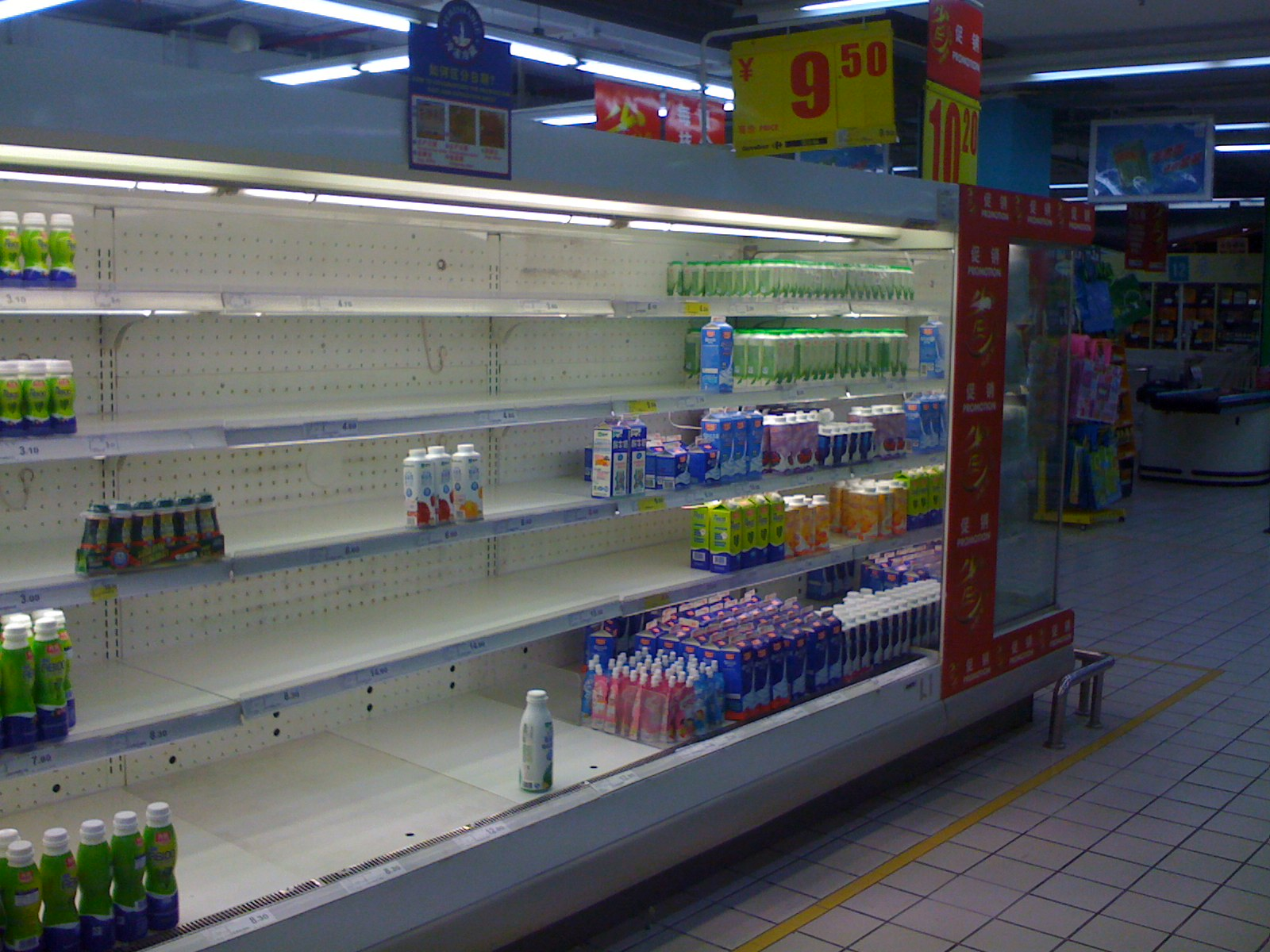
Empty milk shelf in a Carrefour supermarket in China as a result of the scandal

The 2008 Chinese milk scandal was a significant food safety incident in China. The scandal involved Sanlu Group's milk and infant formula along with other food materials and components being adulterated with the chemical melamine, which resulted in kidney stones and other kidney damage in infants. The chemical was used to increase the nitrogen content of diluted milk, giving it the appearance of higher protein content in order to pass quality control testing. 300,000 affected children were identified, among which 54,000 were hospitalized, according to the latest report in January 2009. The deaths of six babies were officially concluded to be related to the contaminated milk.

The timeline of the scandal dated back to December 2007, when Sanlu began to receive complaints about kidney stones. An early complaint was made on 20 May 2008, when a mother posted online after she learnt that Sanlu had donated the milk she had been complaining about to the orphans of the 2008 Sichuan earthquake. Also on 20 May, the problem was raised at Sanlu's Board meeting for the first time and they ordered multiple third-party tests. The culprit, melamine, was undetected in the tests until 1 August. On 2 August, Sanlu's Board decided to issue a trade recall to the wholesalers but did not notify them that the product was contaminated; however, Shijiazhuang's deputy mayor, who was invited to attend, rejected trade recall and instructed the Board to "shut the mouths of the victims by money", "wait until the end of 2008 Beijing Olympics to end smoothly and then the provincial police would hunt the perpetrators". New Zealand dairy giant Fonterra, which owned a 43% stake in Sanlu, were alerted to the contamination on 2 August. Fonterra alerted the New Zealand government and the NZ government confronted the Chinese government on 8 September. The Chinese government made the scandal public on 13 September. After the initial focus on Sanlu, further government inspections revealed that products from 21 other companies were also tainted, including those from Arla Foods–Mengniu, Yili, and Yashili. While more and more cases reached hospitals around the nation from December 2007, the first report to the government by any hospital was made on 16 July.

The issue raised concerns about food safety and political corruption in China and damaged the reputation of the country's food exports. The World Health Organization called the incident "deplorable" and at least 11 foreign countries halted all imports of Chinese dairy products. A number of trials were conducted by the Chinese government resulting in two executions, three sentences of life imprisonment, two 15-year prison sentences, and the firing or forced resignation of seven local government officials and the Director of the Administration of Quality Supervision, Inspection and Quarantine (AQSIQ). The former chairwoman of China's Sanlu dairy was sentenced to life in prison.

In late October 2008, similar adulteration with melamine was discovered in eggs and possibly other foods. The source was traced to melamine being added to animal feed, despite a ban imposed in June 2007 following the scandal over pet food ingredients exported to the United States.

== Melamine ==
Melamine is used to manufacture melamine-formaldehyde resin, a type of plastic known for its flame-retardant properties and commonly employed in countertops, dry-erase boards, etc. It has also been employed as a non-protein nitrogen, appearing in soy meal, corn gluten meal and cottonseed meal used in cattle feed. Melamine is known to cause kidney failure and kidney stones in humans and animals when it reacts with cyanuric acid inside the body. The use of melamine in food production is not approved by the World Health Organization (WHO) or national authorities.

Melamine is nitrogen-rich, so it is sometimes illegally added to food products to increase their apparent protein content. The Kjeldahl and Dumas methods used to test for protein levels fail to distinguish between nitrogen in melamine and naturally occurring nitrogen in amino acids, allowing the protein levels to be falsified. Introduced into milk, it can help conceal fraudulent dilution with water. Melamine adulteration of food products also made headlines when pet food was recalled in Europe and the U.S. in 2007.

=== Source of contamination ===
The World Health Organization (WHO) said melamine may be found "in a variety of milk and milk products at varying levels, from low ppb to ppm ranges". One academic suggested cyromazine, a melamine derivative pesticide commonly used in China for a long time, is absorbed into plants as melamine; it may therefore have long been present in products such as poultry, eggs, fish, and dairy products. It is not known where in the supply chain the melamine was added to the milk. The chemical is not water-soluble, and must be mixed with formaldehyde or another chemical before it can be dissolved in milk.

Because of poor animal husbandry, production and storage and the demand for milk far outstripping supplies, the use of other potentially harmful chemical additives such as preservatives and hydrogen peroxide has been reported by independent media as being commonplace. Quality tests can be falsified with additives: peroxide is added to prevent milk from going bad; industrial vegetable oil is emulsified and added to boost fat levels; whey is used to increase lactose content. However, the procurement chain is also implicated, as milk agents are often politically well-connected. Farmers report salespeople had, for years, been visiting farms in dairy areas hawking "protein powder" additives, which would often be delivered in unmarked brown paper bags of 25 kilograms (55 lb) each. Thus, farmers either added melamine contaminant unwittingly, or turned a blind eye to milk adulteration to ensure their milk was not rejected. The big dairy producers were complicit in producing "test-tube milk".

Caijing reported in 2008 that Hebei dairy farmers had been aware of the practice of "spiking fresh milk with additives such as melamine" since 2006. Because of fierce competition for supplies, and the higher prices paid by Mengniu and Yili, Sanlu's procurement became squeezed; its inspection system became compromised by 2005, which "allowed milk collection stations to adopt unscrupulous business practices", compounded by a complete lack of government supervision.

Caijing also reported the melamine in the tainted milk may have come from scrap melamine costing ¥700 per tonne—less than one-tenth of the price of 99% pure industrial grade melamine. The melamine production process produces pure melamine by crystallisation; the melamine remaining in the mother liquor is impure (70%) and unusable for plastics, so it is scrapped. It said Sanlu's baby formula melamine content was a result of tampering by adding low-cost vegetable protein (such as low-grade soya powder), and large amounts of scrap melamine as filler. (Note: "按照目前的三聚氰胺价格，在饲料甚至原料奶中添加这种物质，从经济上而言并不合算。如果奶粉或者液态奶中出现的三聚氰胺是由于添加三聚氰胺废料引起，那么值得担心的不仅仅是这种物质") Scrap melamine contains impurities such as cyanuric acid that form more insoluble crystals (melamine cyanurate) than melamine alone, aggravating the problem.

=== Victims ===
On 17 September 2008, Health Minister Chen Zhu stated tainted milk formula had "sickened more than 6,200 children, and that more than 1,300 others, mostly newborns, remain hospitalized with 158 suffering from acute kidney failure". By 23 September, about 54,000 children were reported to be sick and four had died. An additional 10,000 cases were reported from the provinces by 27 September. A World Health Organization official said 82% of the children made ill were 2 years of age or below. The Hong Kong Centre for Food Safety said that 99 per cent of the victims were aged under 3 years. Ten Hong Kong children were diagnosed with kidney problems, at least four cases were detected in Macau, and six in Taiwan. Non-human casualties included a lion cub and two baby orangutans which had been fed Sanlu infant formula at Hangzhou Zoo.

The government said on 8 October it would no longer issue updated figures "because it is not an infectious disease, so it's not absolutely necessary for us to announce it to the public". Reuters compiled figures reported by local media across the country, and said the toll stood at nearly 94,000 at the end of September, excluding municipalities. Notably, 13,459 children had been affected in Gansu, Reuters quoted Xinhua saying Henan had reported over 30,000 cases, and Hebei also had nearly 16,000 cases.

In late October, the government announced health officials had surveyed 300,000 Beijing families with children less than 3 years old. It disclosed approximately 74,000 families had a child who had been fed melamine-tainted milk, but did not reveal how many of those children had fallen ill as a result.

Because of the many months before the scandal was exposed, media suggested the official figures were likely to be understated. Kidney stones in infants started being reported in several parts of China in the two years prior. A number of yet-to-be-officially-acknowledged cases were reported by the media. However, those deaths without an official verdict may be denied compensation. On 1 December 2008 Xinhua reported that the Ministry of Health revised the number of victims to more than 290,000 with 51,900 hospitalized; authorities acknowledged receiving reports of 11 suspected deaths from melamine contaminated powdered milk from provinces, but officially confirmed three deaths.

On characterisation and treatment of urinary stones in affected infants, the New England Journal of Medicine printed an editorial in March 2009, along with reports on cases from Beijing, Hong Kong and Taipei.

Urinary calculi specimens were collected from 15 cases treated in Beijing and were analysed as unknown objects for their components at Beijing Institute of Microchemistry using infrared spectroscopy, nuclear magnetic resonance, and high-performance liquid chromatography. The result of the analyses showed the calculi were composed of melamine and uric acid, and the molecular ratio of uric acid to melamine was around 2:1.

In a study published in 2010, researchers from Peking University studying ultrasound images of infants who fell ill in the 2008 contamination found while most children in a rural Chinese area recovered, 12 per cent still showed kidney abnormalities six months later. "The potential for long-term complications after exposure to melamine remains a serious concern", the report said. "Our results suggest a need for further follow-up of affected children to evaluate the possible long-term impact on health, including renal function."

== Companies ==
Contaminated products found in the China AQSIS tests include baby formula products produced by the following companies, in order of highest concentration found. Shijiazhuang Sanlu Group, Shanghai Panda Dairy, Qingdao Shengyuan Dairy, Shanxi Gu Cheng Dairy, Jiangxi Guangming Yingxiong Dairy, Baoji Huimin Dairy, Inner Mongolia Mengniu Dairy, Torador Dairy Industry (Tianjin), Guangdong Yashili Group, Hunan Peiyi Dairy, Heilongjiang Qilin Dairy, Shanxi Yashili Dairy, Shenzhen Jinbishi Milk, Scient (Guangzhou) Infant Nutrition, Guangzhou Jinding Dairy Products Factory, Inner Mongolia Yili Industrial Group, Yantai Ausmeadow Nutriment, Qingdao Suncare Nutritional Technology, Xi'an Baiyue Dairy, Yantai Leilei Dairy, Shanghai Baoanli Dairy, and Fuding Chenguan Dairy.

=== Sanlu ===
The scandal began with revelations of contamination of Sanlu milk products. The New Zealand dairy cooperative Fonterra, which owned a 43% stake in Sanlu, said they were alerted to melamine contamination on 2 August (almost a month before the issue became public), and have said to have pushed hard for a full public recall. Although there was an immediate trade recall, Fonterra said that local administrators refused an official recall. A Fonterra director had given Sanlu management a document detailing the European Union's permitted levels of melamine, but Fonterra chief executive Andrew Ferrier has stated that at no time did Fonterra say small amounts of melamine were acceptable.

==== Warning signs ignored ====
From 2005 to 2006, an agent, Jiang Weisuo, from Shaanxi Jinqiao Dairy Company in northern China reportedly publicly discussed his fears about unauthorised substances being added to competitors' milk. His complaints to regulators and dairy makers in 2005 and 2006 never yielded any result; his story was picked up by China Central Television, who ran a report, complete with footage of adulteration in progress, yet the Shaanxi Quality and Technical Supervision Bureau said they failed to find evidence of wrongdoing.

The bulletin board of the Administration of Quality Supervision, Inspection and Quarantine (AQSIQ) indicated a rare occurrence of kidney stones in children–all causally traced to Sanlu milk formula–was flagged by at least one member of the public in June 2008 and by a urologist in a paediatric hospital on 24 July 2008. Neither received definitive replies. The paediatrician, who specifically asked the AQSIQ to refer his observations to epidemiologists, was asked to refer his query to the health department.

In June, Jiangsu media reported a two-month surge in the number of babies diagnosed with kidney disease; in July, a parent of a sick baby in Hunan questioned Sanlu's powdered milk and complained to the AQSIQ. Gansu Province sent a report to the Ministry of Health on 16 July to alert that one local hospital had identified an increase in the incidence of kidney ailments among babies in the months earlier, and that most victims had consumed Sanlu's baby formula. The health ministry sent investigators to Gansu in early August.

==== Cover-up allegations ====
Fonterra notified the New Zealand government on 5 September and three days later, Prime Minister Helen Clark had Beijing officials alerted directly. News reports began circulating in China on 9 September, and the news was broken internationally by Reuters the following day. The state-controlled media report did not initially identify the company involved. Posts on Chinese social portal Tianya named Sanlu as the culprit, which Sanlu denied.

According to a State Council investigation, Sanlu had known about infants made sick by its products as early as December 2007, but no testing was performed until June 2008. It said leading government officials in Shijiazhuang city had failed to report the contamination to provincial and state authorities (until 9 September) in violation of rules on reporting major incidents involving food safety. According to the People's Daily, on 2 August, Sanlu asked the Shijiazhuang city government to assist them in controlling the media's reporting of the recall.

According to accounts confirmed by media reports and health officials, the company tried to buy off critics and cover up the contamination. In a memo dated 11 August, Beijing-based public relations agency Teller International advised Sanlu to seek cooperation with major search engines to censor negative information. The agency reportedly had repeatedly contacted key account staff at Baidu and proposed a ¥3 million (US$440,000) budget to screen all negative news. After the memo began circulating on the internet, Baidu denounced, in a communiqué on 13 September 2008, the approaches by said agency on several occasions, saying the proposal was firmly rejected, as it violated their corporate principles of unbiased and transparent reporting.

New Zealand Prime Minister Helen Clark said that she believed the Chinese government had been inclined to try to solve the problem quietly, without a recall. According to the Hong Kong-based South China Morning Post, a 21-point coverage directive issued by the Central Propaganda Department to domestic media includes this edict: "All food safety issues [are] off-limits." Some media outlets speculated that China's desire for a perfect summer Olympics contributed to the delayed recall of the baby milk, citing the 21-point coverage directive. The Central government denied issuing this guidance. Hebei provincial vice-governor said his administration was only notified by Shijiazhuang on 8 September.

However, a journalist at Southern Weekend wrote an investigative report in late July for publication about infants who had fallen ill after consuming baby formula from Sanlu. Six weeks later, senior editor Fu Jianfeng made a post on his personal blog stating that this report had been suppressed by authorities because of the imminent Beijing Olympics. While this was happening, Sanlu was honoured in a national award campaign called "30 Years: Brands that Have Changed the Lives of Chinese". The press release on the award, written by a senior public relations manager at Sanlu, passed as news content on People's Daily and in other media.

==== Sanctions ====
On 15 September, the company issued a public apology for the contaminated powdered milk; Sanlu was ordered to halt production, and to destroy all unsold and recalled products. Authorities reportedly seized 2,176 tons of powdered milk in Sanlu's warehouses. An estimated 9,000 tons of product had been recalled.

Tian Wenhua, chairwoman and general manager of Sanlu and Secretary of the Sanlu Communist Party chapter was stripped of her party and functional posts during an extraordinary meeting of the Hebei provincial standing committee of the CCP; four Shijiazhuang officials, including vice mayor in charge of food and agriculture, Zhang Fawang, were reportedly removed from office. Shijiazhuang Mayor Ji Chuntang resigned on 17 September. Li Changjiang, minister in charge of the AQSIQ, was forced to resign on 22 September after the State Council inquest concluded he was responsible for the "negligence in supervision". Investigators also blamed the Shijiazhuang government. Local Party Secretary Wu Xianguo was fired on the same day.

==== Arrests ====
Sanlu general manager Tian Wenhua was charged under Articles 144 and 150 of the criminal code. A spokesman for the Hebei Provincial Public Security Department said police had arrested 12 milk dealers and suppliers who allegedly sold contaminated milk to Sanlu, and six people were charged with selling melamine. Three hundred kg (700 lb) of suspicious chemicals, including 223 kg (492 lb) of melamine, were confiscated. Among those arrested were two brothers who ran a milk collection centre in Hebei for allegedly supplying three tonnes of adulterated milk daily to the dairy; the owner of another collection centre which resold seven tons of milk a day to Sanlu, was arrested, and his operation was shut down.

Zhang Yujun (alias Zhang Haitao), a former dairy farmer from Hebei, produced more than 600 tons of a "protein powder" mixture of melamine and maltodextrin from September 2007 to August 2008. He and eight other traders, dairy farm owners and milk purchasers who bought the powder from him were arrested in early October, bringing the total to 36.

During the week of 22 December 2008, 17 people involved in producing, selling, buying and adding melamine in raw milk went on trial. Tian Wenhua, former Sanlu general manager, and three other company executives appeared in court in Shijiazhuang, charged with producing and selling milk contaminated with melamine. According to Xinhua, Tian pleaded guilty, and told the court she learned about the tainted milk complaints from consumers in mid-May. She then apparently headed a working team to handle the case, but did not report to the Shijiazhuang city government until 2 August.

The Intermediate People's Court in Shijiazhuang sentenced Zhang Yujun and Geng Jinping to death, and Tian Wenhua to life in prison, on 22 January 2009. Zhang was convicted for producing 800 tons of the contaminated powder, Geng for producing and selling toxic food. Geng Jinping managed a milk production centre which supplied milk to Sanlu Group and other dairies. The China Daily reported Geng had knelt on the courtroom floor and begged the victim's families for forgiveness during the trial. The court also sentenced Sanlu deputy general managers Wang Yuliang and Hang Zhiqi to fifteen years and eight years in jail, respectively, and former manager Wu Jusheng to five years. Several defendants have appealed.

Zhang Yujun and Geng Jinping were executed on 24 November 2009.

Tian Wenhua received several sentence reductions for good conduct over the years. In 2011, her life term was reduced to 19 years. Further reductions have since lowered that sentence to 15 years and three months. She is scheduled for release in 2024.

==== Effect on the company and bankruptcy ====
The value of the company plunged as a result of the scandal. On 24 September, Fonterra announced it had written down the carrying value of its investment by NZ$139 million (two-thirds), reflecting the costs of product recall and the impairment of the 'Sanlu' brand because of the "criminal contamination of milk". By 27 September, China Daily reported Sanlu was close to bankruptcy, and might be taken over by the Beijing Sanyuan Foods Company. The company is also facing lawsuits from parents (see Anger at Sanlu).

The Beijing Review said Sanlu expects to have to pay compensation claims totalling ¥700 million, and it became clear the company would be broken up and sold.

On 25 December, Shijiazhuang court accepted a creditor's bankruptcy petition against Sanlu. Media commentators expected the Sanlu distribution network to be sold.

=== Chinese majors ===
On 16 September, the AQSIQ released test of samples from 491 batches of products sold by all 109 companies producing baby formula. It said all 11 samples from Sanlu failed the melamine test. Sanlu, whose products sell at half the price of equivalents on the market, recorded the highest levels of contamination among all the samples tested, at 2,563 mg/kg or parts per million ("ppm"). Tainted samples were found among 21 other suppliers, where concentrations ranged from 0.09 to 619.00 ppm.

There was melamine contamination in 10% of liquid milk samples from Mengniu and Yili, and 6% of those from Bright Dairy. On discovery of contamination, the three major producers were all stripped of their status as 'Chinese national brands'. Yili, Mengniu and Bright Dairy & Food Co. recalled tainted powdered milk and apologised in separate statements. Mengniu recalled all its baby formula, and trading in its shares on the Hong Kong Stock Exchange was suspended on 17 September. Shares in other dairy companies fell strongly the next day. Mengniu's CFO attempted to reassure consumers by offering a no-quibble refund on all products, and by drinking liquid milk in front of reporters in Hong Kong. He also said that its export products were less likely to be contaminated.

On 30 September, the AQSIQ announced test results of a further 265 batches of powdered milk produced by 154 different companies prior to 14 September, where it found 31 batches produced by 20 domestic dairy companies were tainted with melamine.

On 1 December, China's Ministry of Health issued an update, saying nearly 300,000 babies were sickened after consuming melamine-contaminated infant formula.

== Trade and industry impact ==
=== Chinese industry ===
The State Council ordered the testing of product of all dairy producers, and to this end, some 5,000 inspectors were dispatched. The Chinese market has grown at an average annual rate of 23% since 2000. In 2006, milk production reached 30 million tons, ten times the volume of a decade before. It was valued at some ¥122 billion (US$18 billion) in 2007, and consumers had severely lost confidence in the industry.

The events have exposed the often-incestuous relationship between local business and local government. In addition to the tax revenues to local authorities—Sanlu contributed ¥330 million in 2007, many companies invite local officials to become "silent partners" in their corporations—in return for "protection" at the political level; former Sanlu chairman Tian Wenhua was made honorary deputy to the Provincial People's Congress. The scandal has also highlighted structural problems of inadequate production volume, inherent quality issues, and poor production methods. The Inner Mongolia region produces over one-fourth of China's milk, and Mengniu and Yili have invested millions to establish state-of-the-art dairy facilities in its capital, Hohhot. The companies still rely on small-scale farmers for over 90% of their production because of the capacity constraint of the modern facilities. Both companies were said by farmers and agents to have habitually purchased milk which failed quality tests, for only two-thirds the normal price. A new policy was put in place on 17 September to stop that practice.

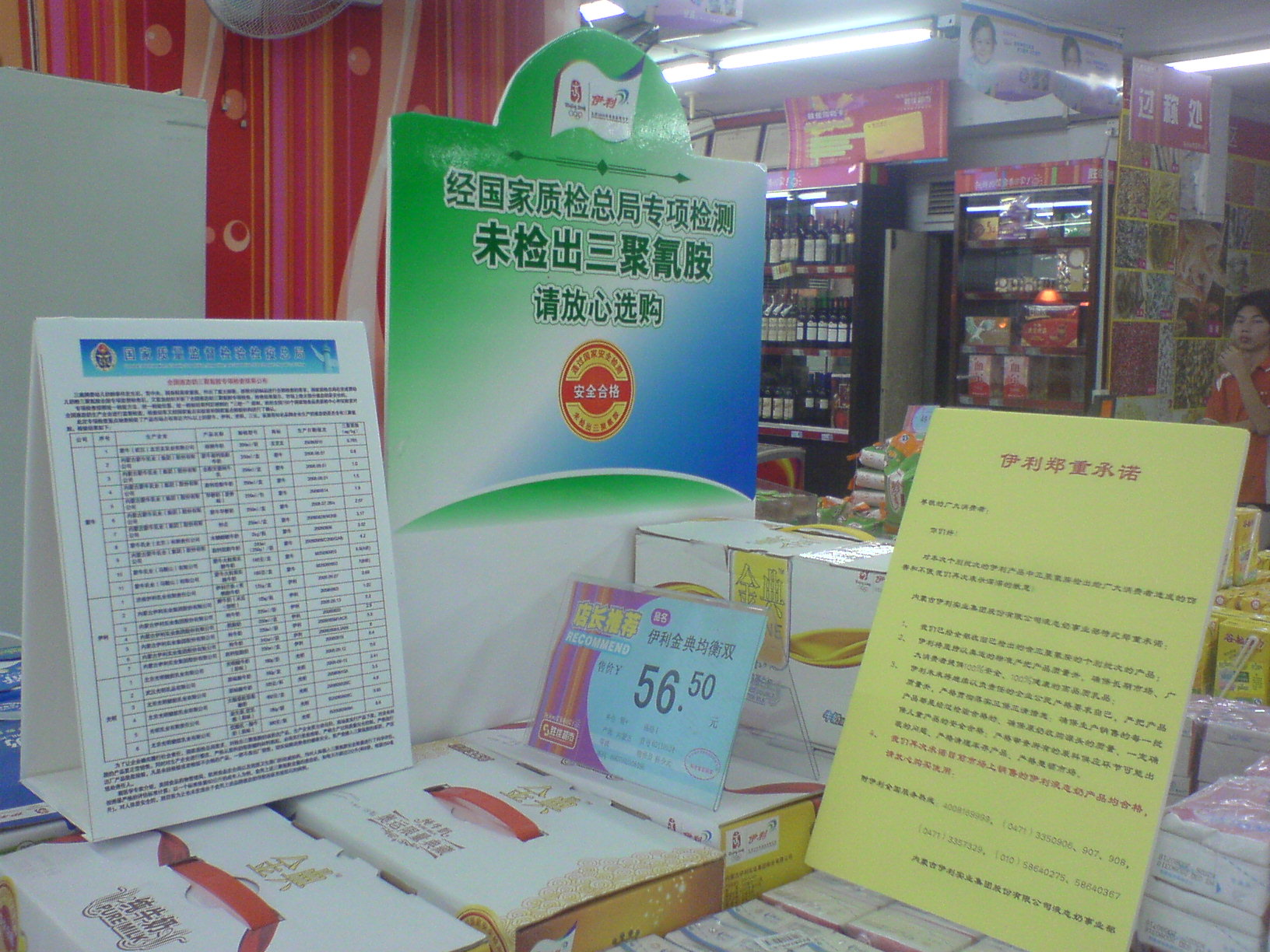
POS materials from Yili Dairy declaring clean bill of health from AQSIQ

Consumer panic resulting from the contaminated milk lessened demand for dairy products, causing hardship to more than 2 million Chinese farmers who had nowhere to sell their milk and no means by which to support their dairy cows. Farmers reportedly poured away milk and faced selling cows to a buyerless market.

Since the scandal erupted, sales have fallen by 30–40% on a comparative basis, according to the Chinese Dairy Association. The Association estimates the financial effect of the order of ¥20 billion, and forecasts that confidence may take up to two years to be fully restored. (Note: "中國奶業協會常務理事王丁棉向記者透露,事件對伊利、蒙牛、光明這三大品牌一線企業的打擊與影響,是較嚴重的。 " 他们的近期产品销售业绩已一落千丈,跌至同期数据的30%–40%。就全国乳品行业而言,它所受到的负面影响也是很大的,此场危机的最低谷波峰期可能要维持至2至3个月之久,至明年中期前仍会处于一个恢复期中。过了恢复期,市场应该开始有明显的反弹,整个事件的阴影淡化直到出现全面的复苏,也许还需要1至 2年的时间。但复苏的速度完全取决于消费者消费信心的恢复与树立。" 王丁棉感慨,这次事件对中国奶业造成的经济损失粗略估计应该超过200亿以上,可谓损失惨重。") In an effort to prop up sales and retain their market share, dairy firms have cancelled their common accord not to use promotions to fight the sales decline: substantial discounts (including BOGOF), free gifts and other point of sale incentives were being offered to shoppers. Their new products are conspicuously labelled "safety inspection passed" to allay consumer fears. (Note: "伊利、蒙牛都在产品包装箱的显著位置赫然加印上"安全合格"、"未检出三聚氰胺"等字样以消除消费者的疑虑")

=== Foreign operations in China ===
Mengniu-Arla, a joint-venture between Danish/Swedish co-operative Arla Foods and Mengniu halted production on 16 September 2008 after three of 28 tests taken from Mengniu showed traces of melamine; the contaminated batches had been recalled.

Mengniu, milk supplier to Starbucks, was replaced by Vitasoy when the coffee retailer eschewed milk in favour of soya milk in its China operations. KFC also suspended selling Mengniu milk.

Seoul-headquartered Lotte Group, a major snacks maker, recalled its Koala's March cookies in Hong Kong and Macau because of contamination, and promised to "look deeply into all the details of the manufacturing process" to preserve customer confidence. The range was also ordered off Dutch and Slovak shelves. Other products were seized when samples tested positive in Malta.

On 29 September, British confectionery group Cadbury recalled all chocolate products made in its Chinese factories due to concerns about melamine contamination, affecting products intended for markets in China, Taiwan, Hong Kong, Japan, Korea and Australia. Tests in Hong Kong found amounts of melamine in China-made Dairy Milk products which exceeded safety regulations.

On 30 September, Unilever recalled its Lipton milk tea powder after the company's internal checks found traces of melamine in the Chinese powdered milk used as an ingredient. Heinz recalled cases of baby cereal in Hong Kong after discovering they contained melamine. Nestlé's factory in Heilongjiang was also implicated: the Taiwanese Department of Health forced the delisting of six Neslac and KLIM products on 2 October for containing minute traces of melamine, although the minister said they did not pose a significant health risk.

Since the milk crisis broke, Nestlé says it has sent 20 specialists from Switzerland to five of its Chinese plants to strengthen chemical testing. On 31 October, it announced the opening of a $10.2 million Beijing research and development centre, to "serve as the base and the reference in food safety for Nestlé in Greater China". Nestlé Chief Technology Officer said the centre was equipped with "highly sophisticated analytical tools for detecting trace amounts of residues and undesirable compounds like melamine or veterinary drugs or natural toxins".

=== Olympics ===
There were concerns dairy products consumed during the 2008 Summer Olympics may have been contaminated. Li Changjiang, the then Director of AQSIQ reassured the international community that all the food, including dairy products, was indeed safe. "We took special quality management measures aimed at food supply for the Games."

=== Outside mainland China ===
PRC Customs said exports of dairy products and eggs in 2007 were valued at US$359 million, a year-on-year increase of 90 per cent. Since the news of the melamine contamination began to circulate, at least 25 countries stopped importing Chinese dairy products. A number of countries had imposed blanket bans on Chinese milk products or its derivatives—among which were Bangladesh, Bhutan, Brunei, Burundi, Cameroon, Chile, Colombia, Dominican Republic, Gabon, India, Côte d'Ivoire, Maldives, Mali, Mexico, Nepal, Papua New Guinea, Paraguay, South Korea, Suriname, Tanzania, Togo, and the United Arab Emirates —joining Indonesia, Taiwan, Japan, Singapore and Malaysia which had also imposed specific bans on Chinese dairy products which tested positive for melamine.

==== Hong Kong ====
The scandal led to an erosion of trust in locally produced infant formula and from then on, many Shenzhen residents and parallel traders travelled across the border to purchase powdered milk from Hong Kong shops. Lower confidence in mainland Chinese production, combined with the relaxation of visa requirements for mainland residents, had resulted in shortages of infant formula in Hong Kong for an extended time. Because of a great public outcry, the Import and Export (General) (Amendment) Regulation 2013 was passed in Hong Kong, prohibiting the unlicensed export of powdered formula, including milk and soya milk powder for infants and children under 36 months. According to the HK government, the regulation is not applicable to "powdered formula that is exported in the accompanied personal baggage of a person aged 16 or above leaving Hong Kong if the person did not leave Hong Kong in the last 24 hours and the formula does not exceed 1.8 kg [4 lb] in total net weight".

Although the Hong Kong government imposed a strict 2-can limit on the export of infant formula in March 2013, spurred price differentials caused by sales tax on the mainland and lax customs, trafficking activity including for powdered milk has continued, exacerbating the Hong Kong-Mainland conflict. The catchment area for traffickers spread from Fan Ling and Sheung Shui southward to Yuen Long and Tuen Mun, causing localist camp such as Civic Passion and Hong Kong Indigenous to take to the streets in direct action in 2015.

==== European Union ====
On 25 September 2008, the EU announced a ban on imports of baby food containing Chinese milk. The European Commission also called for tighter checks on other Chinese food imports; isolated contaminated products were found in the Netherlands, and the French authorities ordered all Chinese dairy products off the shelves; Tesco removed White Rabbit sweets from its stores in the United Kingdom as a precaution.

==== United States Food and Drug Administration ====
In the United States of America, which was otherwise unaffected by the scares, the US distributor of White Rabbit candies recalled the product when samples found in Hartford showed traces of melamine. The candy's maker and subsidiary of Bright Foods, Guan Sheng Yuan, issued a recall to the 50 countries to which it exported.

The U.S. Food and Drug Administration said while food containing melamine below 2.5 parts per million generally did not raise concerns, its scientists were "currently unable to establish any level of melamine and melamine-related compounds in infant formula that does not raise public health concerns". On 12 November 2008, the FDA issued a general alert against all finished food products from China, saying that information received from government sources in a number of countries indicates a wide range and variety of products from a variety of producers have been manufactured using melamine-contaminated milk was a recurring problem. In late November, after the FDA found traces of melamine in one Nestle and one Mead Johnson infant product, the FDA concluded melamine or cyanuric acid alone, "at or below 1 part per million in infant formula do not raise public health concerns" in babies.

The United States Food and Drug Administration opened its first overseas inspection offices in November 2008, with bureaus in Shanghai, Beijing and Guangzhou.

== Responses ==
=== International agencies ===
The European Food Safety Authority (EFSA) warned that children who ate large amounts of confectionery and biscuits with high milk content could theoretically be consuming melamine at more than three times above prescribed EU safety limits (0.5 mg/kg of body weight). The EFSA said children with a mean consumption of products such as milk toffee, biscuits and chocolate containing contaminated powdered milk would not be at risk, and adults would not be at risk even in the worst-case scenarios.

The World Health Organization, which was only notified on 11 September, asked Beijing why it took so many months for the scandal to become public, and to establish whether failure was deliberate or due to ignorance. WHO's representative in China, Hans Troedsson, said the issue of who knew what and when was critical, because knowledge would be the distinction between ignorance and neglect. WHO and UNICEF jointly decried the "deliberate contamination of foods intended for ... vulnerable infants and young children."

Following a spate of mass national bans, the WHO urged national food safety authorities on 25 September to test Chinese dairy products for health risks before placing import bans or recalls. On 26 September, the WHO warned health officials to look out for tainted dairy products imported from China. International Food Safety Authorities (INFOSAN), a network organized by WHO and the Food and Agriculture Organization, suggested that countries should focus on smuggled formula.

WHO referred to the incident as one of the largest food safety events it has had to deal with, and stated it would be difficult to restore the confidence of Chinese consumers in baby formula. It saw regulation failing to keep pace with the rapid development of the food and industrial production as opening the gates to all types of misbehaviour and malfeasance. The spokesman said the scale of the problem proved it was "clearly not an isolated accident, [but] a large-scale intentional activity to deceive consumers for simple, basic, short-term profits".

WHO Director-General Margaret Chan reminded Chinese mothers that breastfeeding was the best way to provide nutrition to infants while avoiding a risk of melamine exposure. She noted that the scandal showed "the impact and power of globalisation" in food distribution and highlighted "the importance of seamless cooperation from farm to consumer".

=== Chinese public ===
==== Anger at Sanlu ====
The case has brought anger and resentment towards milk producers and sowed uncertainty and confusion amongst the population. Queues formed outside Sanlu's offices for refunds. The Sanlu website was hacked several times and its name as displayed in the header bar changed to 三聚氰胺集团 ("The Melamine Group") in a play of words on the character "三" (number 3), which is the first word of Sanlu's Chinese name: 三鹿 (Three Deer); "Melamine" was also added as a product name by a hacker. As has been increasingly common practice, web users vented their anger on internet bulletin boards. Prevalent food scares have increased the number of online parodies circulated by netizens.

Before the government began offering free medical treatment, some parents had reportedly spent small fortunes on medical care for their sick children. Children who fell ill before the scandal broke on 12 September were not entitled to free medical care offered by the State. Parents of two such victims, one from Henan and one from Guangdong, filed writs against Sanlu despite government pressure. Parents of the Henan child had claimed ¥150,000 for medical, travel and other expenses incurred after their child developed kidney stones. On 20 October, the parents of one baby who died from contaminated milk appealed to New Zealand for justice on TV ONE. A total of nine cases were filed against Sanlu in Shijiazhuang. Following weeks of discussions, and in the absence of a compensation plan, a group of 15 lawyers filed a class-action lawsuit on behalf of 100 families against Sanlu, seeking medical and other expenses as well as compensation for trauma and for death of an offspring.

==== Anger at political leaders ====
Resentment increased towards the country's leaders due to the perception that they were not troubled by the food security turmoil faced by ordinary citizens. In August 2008, Zhu Yonglan (祝詠蘭), Director of the State Council Central Government Offices Special Food Supply Centre (CGOSFSC), disclosed in a speech that her firm had been set up in 2004 to source high-quality, all-organic foodstuffs from farms working under the strictest guidelines, for supply to top political leaders, their families and retired cadres.

The State Council Party and State Organisations Special Food Supply Centre ... is supported by the State Council Logistics Base, Central Security Bureau farms, and supply bases spread over all 13 provinces, municipalities ... and autonomous regions. These bases supply the 94 ministries' and commissions' veteran cadres with high quality organic food products ... [Our] products accord with the highest standards.

... Everyone knows that at present average production facilities use large quantities of chemical fertilizers and pesticides. Antibiotics and hormones are used in the raising of animals. Aquatic animal products are raised in polluted waters. All of these toxins end up in the final food products (all kinds of produce, meat, dairy products etc.). It goes without saying that these are harmful when consumed by humans.

— Zhu Yonglan, Director of the CGOSFSC, Speech to Shandong KR Biomedical, 18 August 2008

Chinese premier Wen Jiabao apologised to the nation, saying he felt "extremely guilty" about the poisoned milk products, in the same way he had previously asked the people's pardon for the deaths of coal miners, polluted drinking water, and train passengers stranded by the authorities' inadequate response to the severe snowstorm during the New Year.

==== Quest for milk substitutes ====
Poorer consumers reliant on local infant formula, which was approximately half the price of imported brands, had been left without alternatives to feed their children. Many had lost faith in local brands, with others unsure of which brands were safe. Supermarket shelves had been swept bare from product recalls. Shops in Hong Kong reported a rush for imported formula from cross-border shoppers, with some retailers reportedly rationing their stocks. Some mainlanders were also reportedly rushing to import infant formula from Kinmen. Wet nurses enjoyed a resurgence in popularity in major cities. Some media reports have documented that Chinese sailors and expatriates have been buying local dairy produce in Australia to send back to relatives in China. It had been estimated in 2018 that up to 80% to 90% of infant formula purchased in Australia was destined for China. Following widespread complaints and appeals by exasperated Australian parents unable to find formula for their children, Coles supermarkets resorted to locking baby formula tins away behind the Service Counter, like tobacco products, in order to regulate their sale. The two major supermarkets, Coles and Woolworths, placed a two item limit on baby formula purchases to curb the growing practice of bulk purchasing by predominantly Chinese customers known as daigou, or "personal shoppers". These people would often travel in large, organised groups from supermarket to supermarket, clearing the shelves of baby formula, then make substantial profits by sending the formula to China to be sold at a significant markup.

=== Taiwan ===
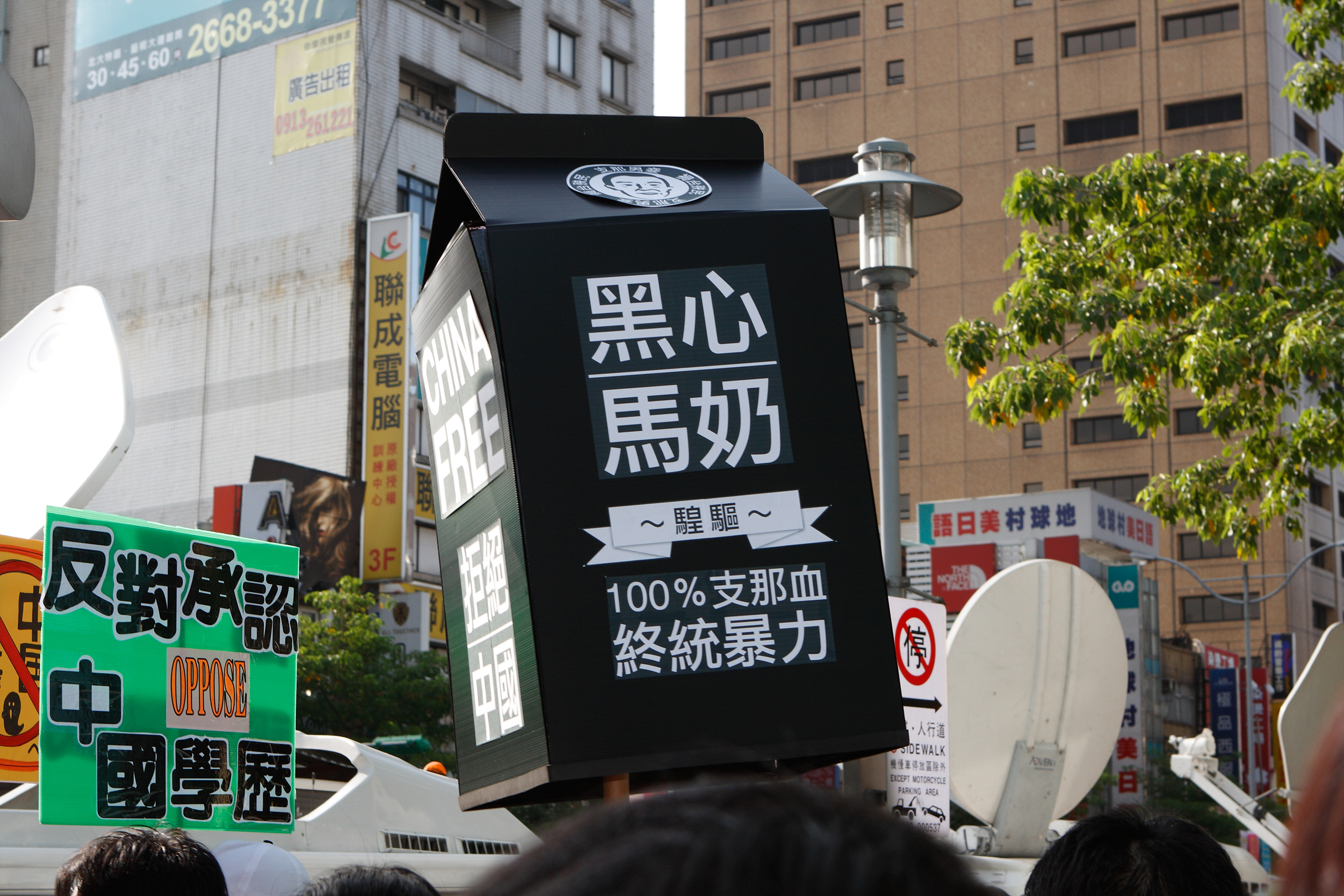
Half a million participated in anti-China demonstrations in Taiwan.

The melamine food scare became a focal point against the warming relations between Taiwan's government and the Chinese government, and a major demonstration was held by the opposition Democratic Progressive Party on 25 October 2008 to voice dissatisfaction with Taiwan's increasingly closer ties with Beijing, notably related to the incident. Protesters fearful at reunification blamed the Kuomintang for the melamine scare, and criticised it for failing to stand up to China over the contamination. One citizen voiced concern that President Ma Ying-jeou's promise for closer ties with China would bring in more tainted products to Taiwan. The Minister of the Department of Health, Lin Fang-yue, was heavily criticised for raising the legally acceptable limit of melamine in food products from zero to 2.5 ppm. The public outcry subsequent to the move forced Lin to resign. His successor, Yeh Ching-chuan, announced a return to the original zero-tolerance policy to melamine.

=== PRC government ===
==== Top leaders' comments ====
AQSIQ announced the revocation of all exemptions from inspection previously granted to dairy producers, who were asked to cease citing the privilege in their advertisements. The State Council ordered an overhaul of the dairy industry, and promised to provide free medical care to those affected. Formally, the State Council released its initial findings, and a top-level official apology of the incident both came on 21 September. Wen Jiabao apologised while visiting victims in hospitals.

This incident made me feel sad, though many Chinese have been understanding. It disclosed many problems for government and company supervision of the milk sources, quality and marketing administration ... The government will put more efforts into food security, taking the incident as a warning. What we are trying to do is to ensure no such event happens in future by punishing those leaders as well as enterprises responsible. None of those companies without professional ethics or social morals will be let off.

— Wen Jiabao, China's Premier (21 September 2008)

On 1 October, CPC general secretary Hu Jintao noted the importance of food safety to the public, and said that "Chinese companies should learn from the lessons of the Sanlu tainted milk powder incident."

On 6 October 2008, putting the blame on "illegal production and greed", the country's "chaotic dairy production and distribution order", and the "gravely absent supervision" for the crisis, the State Council announced new dairy industry regulations. In response to the crisis, the State Council of China issued the "Regulations on the Supervision and Administration of Dairy Product Quality and Safety" on October 10, 2008, to regulate the production, processing, packaging and sales of dairy products, thereby ensuring content and quality compliance. On November 19, 2008, the State Council promulgated the "China Dairy Industry Reorganization and Revitalization Plan" to rectify the chaos in China's dairy industry.

On 9 October 2008, in an attempt to control the damage to Chinese dairy exports, officials at a World Trade Organization meeting insisted that contamination had been "accidental", directly contradicting the WHO observations. Chinese trade representatives criticised countries which have imposed blanket bans on Chinese food products. They urged member states to base import restrictions on scientific risk assessments, and to use official WTO notification mechanisms. On 11 October, Deputy Health minister Liu Qian stated that all the foreign companies' application for compensation for dairy products recall would be dealt with on a commercial basis, although government may use diplomatic channels if necessary, if problems were encountered.

==== Stepped-up inspection program ====
According to a senior quality inspectorate official, the government aimed to establish nearly 400 product testing centres within the next two years, and 80 of these would be food testing centres. Working groups were established in nearly every single province in order to set up new food testing centres and replace outdated equipment.

On 24 September 2008, China's newly appointed AQSIQ chief Wang Yong said that the government would "carry out 'forceful' measures to deal with the chemical contamination", and stated that inspectors had removed 7,000 tonnes of melamine-contaminated dairy products from shops all over China.

On 4 October, the Ministry of Agriculture announced it had drawn up an emergency rescue plan with the Ministry of Finance to give special subsidies to dairy farmers seriously affected by the lack of demand following the contamination scandal; local governments had already drafted policies to stabilise the dairy industry; 150,000 officials had been sent to overhaul the entire supply chains from cattle feed to milk collection; 18,803 milk-collecting stations had been registered and checked by these officials. The ministry was reported to have investigated 98 dairy producers and farms, banned 151 illegal companies and indicted three manufacturers for feed containing melamine. During an investigation into melamine contamination at Yili and Mengniu in Hohhot, police arrested six more people for allegedly selling and mixing melamine into raw milk. The AQSIQ announced on 5 October that all tests showed all milk produced after 14 September were free from contamination. The General Administration of Quality Supervision, Inspection and Quarantine stated all dairy products made before 14 September will be tested for melamine. They gave notice to all supermarkets, shops, and all city, town and village-level vendors to urgently remove and seal up all powdered milk and liquid milk made before 14 September, pending further testing.

Five government agencies, including the Ministry of Health, issued a joint statement on 9 October setting the legally acceptable level of melamine content in infant formula at 1 ppm (1 mg/kg), and at 2.5ppm in other dairy products (including milk) - in line with standards recognised by the World Health Organization and the UN Food and Agriculture Organization. A researcher at the Chinese Centre for Disease Control and Prevention said that any amount exceeding 1 ppm would give reason to suspect its presence was intentional.

==== Public relations ====
On 26 September 2008, in order to quell the disquiet over the speech by Zhu Yonglan of the CGOSFSC regarding leaders' insulation from the food-security issues faced by the general population, Xinhua issued a brief statement, in Chinese, denying the existence of the centre, the award, or any person named Zhu Yonglan, saying these were "purely rumours".

On 16 September, the AQSIQ tests on baby milk powder produced by 109 companies showed 69 batches from 22 companies to be melamine-contaminated; the State Council attempted to reassure that formula produced by most companies in China was safe. It said: "the number of companies with melamine-tainted milk accounted for 20.18% of the total of powdered milk companies in China; the number of tainted batches accounted for 14.05% of the total batches tested." On 30 September, the AQSIQ said its tests on 265 batches from 154 companies showed that "only 18%" had tested positive for melamine: "of the 290 dairies nationwide 154 dairies, representing 87% market share, 134 of these dairies had tested negative for melamine."

On 16 September, the AQSIQ published results of tests on 408 liquid milk producers, and found "most dairy products were safe to drink", although the test results showed nearly 10 percent of batches from Mengniu, Yili and Bright were contaminated.

The government stressed that no new cases of melamine-related illnesses had been detected since 20 September, and that test results on samples from 31 brands of baby formula, 84 brands powder for adult consumption, and 75 domestic brands of liquid milk produced after 14 September did not contain melamine, the AQSIQ said. To demonstrate that its emergency measures had been effective, the Ministry of Agriculture said the rate of raw milk dumping because of the contamination scandal has decreased from 23.6% on 22 September to 4.6% on 1 October.

==== Censorship ====
During the scandal, China's media was ordered to tone down coverage of the unfolding scandal to prevent unrest. News editors were told to adhere to the official copy provided by China's state news agency, Xinhua News Agency, and to emphasize other news instead. China Central Television shifted its reporting emphasis to the launch of Shenzhou VII, with the announcement of the AQSIQ test results relegated to the final item on the CCTV evening news. As a result of media suppression, Chinese consumers were ill-informed about the extent of global recalls. According to Chinese journalists, discussion of the causes of the crisis, government responsibility, questions about government complicity with dairy companies, was forbidden.

On 2 January, a website created by individuals protesting against Sanlu was also blocked by the authorities. A group of parents whose children were rendered ill by melamine-contaminated milk held a news conference to draw attention to the plight of their sick children; five were allegedly detained by police and taken to a labour camp outside Beijing. They were released a day later.

In 2012, Jiang Weisuo, a 44-year-old general manager of a dairy products plant in Shaanxi province, was rumoured to have been murdered in Xi'an. Jiang had first alerted authorities to the scandal. According to the Xi'an Evening News, Jiang died in hospital on 12 November from knife wounds inflicted by his wife, Yang Ping. However, the report that he was killed by his wife was later claimed to be incorrect.

==== Pressure on the legal profession ====
A group of 90 lawyers from Hebei, Henan and Shandong—the three worst affected provinces—had made pro bono offers to assist victims, and a list of their names was published. Organisers of the group declared that they had come under pressure from officials to not get involved in the issue. The Beijing Lawyers' Association, a part of the Communist Party apparatus, asked its members "to put faith in the party and government". Other members of the group have reportedly received less subtle requests. Authorities are said to fear social unrest if lawsuits were unleashed. Pro-Beijing Hong Kong journal Ta Kung Pao reported that central authorities, fearful of the effect of mass lawsuits, held a meeting with lawyers' groups on 14 September, asking them to "act together, and help maintain stability".

Chang Boyang, one of the group of volunteer lawyers, said he had filed one suit in Guangdong against Sanlu on behalf of the parents of one victim, and another suit in Henan. According to Chang, the justice department of Henan ordered 14 Henan lawyers to drop their cases and "follow the arrangements set out by the government". He said they were told that if they did not, "the lawyer and the firm will be dealt with." Zhang Yuanxin, lawyer and officer in the Xinjiang Lawyers' Association said that these government actions have "set back the development of the legal profession," and called this interference in citizen lawsuits "intolerable".

An official said that central government had issued instructions placing the cases on hold, pending a decision on how to handle the cases in a unified manner. Furthermore, that court was instructed not to give any written replies or accept Sanlu-related cases in the meantime.

==== Criminal prosecutions ====
| Person | Crime | Sentence |
|---|---|---|
| Zhang Yujun | Public endangerment. Producing and selling 776 tons of melamine-laced "protein powder". | Death |
| Geng Jinping | Selling and producing toxic food. Adding melamine-laced powder to fresh milk and selling to Sanlu and other companies | Death |
| Gao Junjie | Making and supplying melamine-laced "protein powder" | Death (suspended) |
| Tian Wenhua (former chairwoman of Sanlu Group) | With commutation for 3 times, is scheduled to be released on Aug 3 2027. | Life imprisonment |
| Zhang Yanzhang, a middleman | | Life imprisonment |
| Xue Jianzhong (owner of an industrial chemical shop) | | Life imprisonment |
| Wang Yuliang (former executive of Sanlu) | | 15 years imprisonment |
| Xiao Yu | Aiding and abetting her husband Gao Junjie | 5 years imprisonment |

=== Other third parties ===
==== Economic root causes ====
Stratfor claimed that the act of adulterating milk and baby food in full knowledge of potentially severe sanctions, including execution, seemed like "an act of desperation". It noted that in 2008 dairy farmers became squeezed by growing costs of livestock, feed, facilities, and government-imposed price caps. Mengniu's share price had fallen 12% since October 2007 because of higher costs of raw milk (due partly to rising costs of cattle feed) and price controls—anti-inflation measures targeted at the dairy sector announced on 16 January. Milk suppliers accordingly resorted to subtler cost-cutting methods to preserve diminishing profits.

==== Damage caused ====
The similarities between China today and New York 150 years ago shouldn't come as a great surprise. Adulteration on such a scandalous scale occurs in societies with a toxic combination of characteristics: a fast-growing capitalist economy coupled with a government unable or unwilling to regulate the food supply. In such get-rich-quick societies, there is a huge temptation to tamper with food, particularly when margins are low. The rewards are instant, and it's not always easy for consumers to detect the difference between the pure and the doctored—particularly with a substance like milk, which we have been taught to trust implicitly.

— Bee Wilson, The New York Times

The hopeful news in all this is that in the process of creating so much toxicity both the distressed loans and the distressed food are teaching us important lessons about the limits of scale and regulation that support the massive globalisation of the last decade. We are learning that regulators have lost the ability, if they ever had it, to truly monitor the extent of the danger.

— David E. Gumpert, San Francisco Chronicle

Joseph Sternberg of The Wall Street Journal said that Beijing's failures of food-safety act are "much more pernicious, and disgraceful, than at first it appears ... [not only has this] milk poisoned thousands of infants with melamine, it also poisons the society at large with fear". Lawyer Bill Marler, speaking at a food safety conference in Beijing, said that this food scare has harmed the "made in China" brand abroad. He remarked: "If this product had gotten into the United States, it would have been 'game over' for a lot of products in China."

An op-ed in The New York Times compared this to the "swill milk scandal" in New York in the 1850s in which 8,000 children reportedly died when cows were fed swill and the milk produced was then whitened with plaster of Paris, thickened with starch and eggs, and hued with molasses.

An article published in the San Francisco Chronicle likened the regulatory failures of the milk scandal to the distressed assets in the subprime mortgage crisis, and questioned whether regulators in either case ever understood or truly monitored the extent of the danger.

Louis Klarevas, a professor at New York University's Center for Global Affairs, said of the products on the list of potentially harmful products reaching the US in recent years were exclusive to China: "Yet as more large-scale labor markets compete for their share of international trade, the incentives to cut corners will increase and the temptation to overlook hazardous goods might become a more common occurrence."

On 10 November 2008 issue of the Singaporean newspaper Today, Bill Durodié, then a senior fellow at the S. Rajaratnam School of International Studies responded to the possibility of more such incidents in the future due to the more liberal trading relations with China by saying: "exposing the Chinese to the world market is probably the fastest way of addressing these issues."

==== Power structure ====
The structure of the Chinese government was criticized for contributing to the scandal. Time magazine cited analysts saying the party's need to maintain control of the economy and of information undermines the independence of any regulatory system. One analyst, Willy Lam, a Senior Fellow at The Jamestown Foundation, indicated that CCP's pervasive control over political and economic resources has resulted in a lack of accountability in government systems.

Hu Xingdou (胡星斗), a professor at Beijing Institute of Technology, said: "There hasn't been an effort to establish a moral foundation to the market economy, and this incident is the inevitable result." Hu urged the leadership to transform the way of thinking, to repair the system, rather than dealing with problems as they arise. A Beijing-based consultancy, Dragonomics, concurred that "the problem was rooted in the Communist Party's continued involvement in pricing control, company management and the flow of information". Independent regulation was lacking or ineffective as local industries were so intertwined with local officialdom.

The Times reported that while one child in 20 in Shanghai could have kidney damage as a result of drinking contaminated formula milk, on the other hand, "like the emperors of old, the new communist elite enjoy the finest produce from all over China, sourced by a high-security government department."

Access Asia, a Shanghai-based consumer consultancy, said Fonterra was an example of western executives in China "believ[ing] advice in business books that they must avoid making their local partners 'lose face' at all costs". It suggested that Fonterra paid the price for this both financially and in damage to their reputation.

Caijing said the crisis revealed that there had been a "serious dereliction of duty" at the AQSIQ, and that the government had failed as a "night watchman". Citing public consensus that government should limit itself to a supervisory role, it urged the construction of a regulatory system which addressed the role of regulators watching over the production process, avoiding over-regulation, 'regulatory capture' and abuse of power by regulators. "Keeping the market in order and ensuring independent law enforcement should be part of the mandate."

==== Culture of secrecy ====
David Bandurski, journalist and researcher at China Media Project, criticised the state's control of the media for suppressing "information critical to the well-being of ordinary Chinese". He asserted that increased press freedom needs to be a component of any strategy to deal with this and other future food-security lapses in China. Bandurski cited warnings on 9 October 2008 issues of Nanfang Daily and the Information Times for consumers to be aware of that problematic dairy stock (that produced before 14 September) have reappeared in some stores under cover of aggressive promotions.

Former senior party official Bao Tong said "the more dark secrets are exposed, the better. You can't cure the disease, or save the Chinese people, until you get to the root of the problem." "If the Chinese government tries to play down this incident, there will be no social stability in China, let alone harmony ... It will mean that this government has lost the most basic level of trust."

=== Chinese social critics ===
As a reaction to and comment on the scandal, Chinese artist and video animation producer Pi San created "Little Rabbit, Be Good" as part of his popular Kuang Kuang video series. Though officially banned or forbidden by the Chinese government, clever use of Chinese web services such as Baidu allows Chinese citizens to access this and many other forbidden materials.

=== Relationship with Australia ===
Because of the high Chinese demand for quality Australian products, major Australian retailers implemented tin limits to control sales of baby formula, but reports of daigou shoppers flouting the system with people taking multiple tins of the formula before they'd been placed on shelves, and the daigou shoppers stripping shelves in groups of up to eight people, before Australian mothers could access the baby food. This daigou activity has been facilitated by the Chinese Navy and its warships.

== Widening contamination ==
The search widened when some manufacturers tested positive despite reportedly not using Chinese milk. The Sri Lankan manufacturer of Munchee Lemon Puff biscuits, having tested positive in Switzerland, categorically stated that its powdered milk or milk products were sourced only from Australia, the Netherlands and Canada; similarly, Pokka products without milk or its derivatives from China were found by Vietnamese authorities to be contaminated.

=== Chicken and eggs ===
Japanese and South Korean authorities' tests on imported powdered eggs from China found melamine contamination. Japan found melamine in frozen fried chicken imported from China. The South Korean supplies were traced to two companies in Dalian. On 26 October, Hong Kong authorities discovered 4.7ppm melamine in eggs from Dalian. Hong Kong Secretary for Food and Health, York Chow, suspected the melamine came from feed given to the chickens that laid the eggs. On 29 October, Hong Kong authorities discovered a third batch of eggs containing excessive melamine. The Taiwanese Department of Health said that six batches of protein powder from Jilin and Dalian were found to contain 1.90 to 5.03ppm of melamine.

Agriculture officials speculated that adulterated feed given to hens could explain melamine in eggs. The Web sites of Xinhua and People's Daily both carried a story from the Nanfang Daily that mixing melamine into animal feed was an "open secret" in the industry: melamine scrap was mixed into an inexpensive "protein powder" resold to feed suppliers. People in the trade interviewed by BusinessWeek also confirmed it was common practice, and had been going on for "years", with most believing it to be non-toxic to animals. Melamine dealers said after Sanlu, the government started clamping down on melamine sales to food processing companies or to manufacturers of animal feed.

=== Baking powder ===
Malaysian authorities determined that ammonium bicarbonate, not milk, imported from China was the source of contamination at the Khong Guan and Khian Guan biscuit factory. Malaysian authorities said it was probable cross contamination of batches from Chinese companies Broadtech Chemical Int. Co Ltd, Dalian Chemical Industries and Tianjin Red Triangle International Trading Co, and did not suspect adulteration. On 19 October, Taiwanese authorities detected melamine in 469 tons of ammonium bicarbonate imported from China. Samples tested showed up to 2,470ppm of melamine.

== Impact and response ==
=== International agencies ===
Jorgen Schlundt, head of food safety at the WHO criticised China's food-safety system for being "disjointed", saying that "poor communications between ministries and agencies may have prolonged the outbreak of melamine poisoning."

=== Chinese public and the trade ===
Public concerns have resulted in demand and egg prices falling throughout the country. Prices at a large Beijing wholesale market dropped 10%, and prices fell by 10% the day after news of the contamination broke in Hong Kong. Wholesalers have refused to stock products without melamine inspection certificates. The Beijing Youth Daily reported that farmers had been forced to slaughter tens of thousands of chickens.

In 2008, Zhao Lianhai (赵连海), a Chinese man whose son was sickened by tainted milk earlier that year, started a website called "Home for the Kidney Stone Babies" (结石宝宝之家, jieshibaobao.com), which helped families with children affected by tainted milk share their experiences, in part by maintaining a database of medical records. The website upset Chinese authorities, who detained Zhao in November 2009 and arrested him in December 2009.

=== PRC government ===
The Chinese government said that producers violating the law "could have their licenses revoked and be handed over to law enforcement organs". A senior Agriculture Ministry official said that of a quarter of a million feed-makers and animal farms inspected for melamine contamination, inspectors found more than 500 engaged in "illegal or questionable practices". Some 3,700 tonnes of feed with excessive melamine were seized.

Hong Kong regulators have requested certification of exported eggs, but the central government has not yet mounted a centralised response; although mainland authorities already require eggs to be certified as free of avian influenza and Sudan red dye prior to export following previous food-safety scares, the AQSIQ has declined nationwide testing. Local government, for example Guangdong authorities, have increased random inspections at poultry farms. They declared to "harshly crack down on the unlawful behaviour of illegally manufacturing, selling and using melamine".

== Contamination and response in 2009–2010 ==
On 2 December 2009, China detained three employees of Shaanxi Jinqiao Dairy Company in northwest China suspected of selling 5.25 tons of melamine-laced powdered milk to Nanning Yueqian Food Additive Company, in Guangxi. On 30 December 2009, Xinhua reported continuing problems: powder and flavouring products sold by another company involved in the original scandal–the Shanghai Panda Dairy Company–were found to contain illegal levels of melamine; the dairy was closed and three of its executives arrested. On 25 January 2010, it was reported that three food companies from Hebei, Liaoning and Shandong provinces had produced melamine tainted products in March and April 2009 and that the three companies were banned from selling products in Guizhou. On 10 February 2010 China's state council announced a food safety commission, consisting of three vice premiers and a dozen minister-level officials, to address the nation's food regulatory problems. The group aims to improve government coordination and enforcement and to solve systemic food safety problems. As part of its ongoing effort to find and destroy any melamine-tainted milk remaining on the market, the Chinese government announced that it was recalling 170 tons of powdered milk laced with the industrial chemical which was supposed to have been destroyed or buried in 2008 but has recently found to have been repackaged and placed back into the marketplace.

In July 2010, Xinhua reported that authorities had seized 64 tonnes of dairy product contaminated with melamine from Dongyuan Dairy Factory, in Minhe County, in Qinghai, after authorities in Gansu discovered the contaminated powdered milk. Approximately 38 tonnes of raw materials had been purchased from Hebei, raising the possibility that traders had bought tainted milk that was supposed to have been destroyed after the 2008 scandal. Police have detained the owner and production director of the factory. Powdered milk produced in the plant was mainly sold in Zhejiang and Jiangsu, with only a small amount sold in Qinghai. Also, in Jilin, authorities were testing samples of suspect powdered milk produced in Heilongjiang.

At the end of June 2010, Beijing lowered the minimum protein level for raw milk, from 2.955 to 2.8%, to discourage dairy farmers from attempting to falsify the passing of protein tests. Wu Heping, secretary general of the Heilongjiang Dairy Industry Association noted that between 75% and 90% of raw milk in some provinces had failed to reach the old protein level standard (in place since 1986) in 2007 and 2008. He said that the new standard reflected "the reality of the domestic dairy farm industry". However, Guangzhou dairy industry association president Wang Dingmian stated that this alone would not remove the incentive for adulteration, because milk price still depends on protein content.

== See also ==
- 2007 pet food recalls
- 2009 Chinese lead poisoning scandal
- 2013 Fonterra recall
- 2022 United States infant formula shortage
- Chinese protein export contamination
- Food safety in China
- Official test failures of the 2008 Chinese milk scandal
- Swill milk scandal
- Timeline of the 2008 Chinese milk scandal

== Explanatory and reference notes ==
Verbatim quote

For verification purposes, the following are relevant citations in Chinese from the Caijing article dated 29 September 2008

For verification purposes, the following are relevant citations in Chinese from the Nanfang Daily article dated 9 October 2008
