= QS mark =

Chinese quality and safety label for food

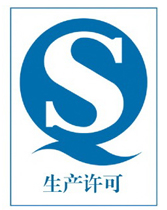
The QS mark consists of the stylized letters Q and S.

The QS mark, from Authorized Manufacturing for Enterprises (Chinese: 企业食品生产许可; Pinyin: Qǐyè shípǐn shēngchǎn xǔkě) and also stands for the English words "quality" and "safety", is a Chinese quality and safety mark for food, beverages and other products, formally known as the Industrial Product Manufacturing License.

== Description ==
Introduced in 2003, it is managed by the General Administration of Quality Supervision, Inspection and Quarantine (GAQSIQ). The license is required for many product categories if they are both manufactured and sold in China. The mark was deprecated in October 2018, and replaced with the SC system, which consists of the letters SC followed by a 14 digit number. SC means "Production" (Chinese: 生产; Pinyin: Shēngchǎn) and the number is partially unique to each food processing facility. The first three digits represent the food category, the next two digits represent the province, the 6th and 7th digits represent the city, the 8th and 9th the district, the 10th to 13th are the sequence code for the production license, which is unique and has to be renewed every 5 years, and the last digit is the evaluation code. An example code is SC10532011500380, which means: 105: milk, 32: Jiangsu, 01: Nanjing, 15: Jiangning district, 0038: license number, and 0: evaluation code, Meaning that the product was made in the Jiangning district of Nanjing, Jiangsu province.

== See also ==
- Food safety in China
- State Administration for Market Regulation
