= Sanlu Group =

Chinese dairy products company

Sanlu Group CO., Ltd.
- Native name: 三鹿集团
- Type: Private
- Industry: Dairy products
- Founded: 16 February 1956
- Defunct: 24 December 2008
- Fate: Bankruptcy after the 2008 Chinese milk scandal
- Headquarters: Shijiazhuang, Hebei, China
- Area served: China
- Key people: Zhang Zhenling (Chairman)
- Products: Milk, infant formula, powdered milk
- Owner: Fonterra (43%)
- Website: wayback.archive.org/*/http://www.sanlu.com/

Sanlu Group
- Chinese: 三鹿集团
- Literal meaning: Three deer group
Transcriptions
Standard Mandarin
- Hanyu Pinyin: Sānlù Jítuán

Shijiazhuang Sanlu Group Co., Ltd.
- Simplified Chinese: 石家庄三鹿集团股份有限公司
- Traditional Chinese: 石家莊三鹿集團股份有限公司
Transcriptions
Standard Mandarin
- Hanyu Pinyin: Shíjiāzhuāng Sānlù Jítuán Gǔfèn Yǒuxiàn Gōngsī

Sanlu Group CO., Ltd. (SJZSGCZ) was a Chinese dairy products company based in Xinhua District, Shijiazhuang, the capital city of Hebei. It produced one of the oldest and most popular brands of infant formula in China. New Zealand's Fonterra owned 43% of Sanlu.

In September 2008, it was involved in an adulterated powdered milk scandal, affecting some 294,000 Chinese infants and killing six. Their infant formula had been adulterated with melamine, which can cause kidney stones and other complications. It received a bankruptcy order from Shijiazhuang Court on 24 December 2008, and several of its top managers were sentenced to long prison terms.

== Ownership and business ==
The company began as Shijiazhuang Dairy Company (SDC) on 16 February 1956. After several acquisitions in 1995, Sanlu Group was formed in 1996. Tian Wenhua, then general manager of SDC, became President and general manager of Sanlu. Under Tian, Sanlu led the Chinese powdered milk market for 13 consecutive years in terms of sales. Tian was considered one of the most successful entrepreneurs in China for her role in building the company. She was named deputy chairman of the China Dairy Industry Association (中国乳制品工业协会), and elected to the National Committee of the Chinese People's Political Consultative Conference. The company was a collective; managers and workers both owned shares of Sanlu.

Sanlu became Shijiazhuang's largest taxpayer since it had become the largest formula seller in China for a continuous 15-year period. Richard McGregor, author of The Party: The Secret World of China's Communist Rulers, said that Sanlu became "an invaluable asset for a city otherwise struggling to attract industry and investment on a par with China's premier metropolises."

In December 2005, a joint venture agreement was signed which involved New Zealand dairy cooperative Fonterra taking a 43% equity stake in the Chinese dairy by injecting ¥864 million. The joint venture company started trading in 2006. The majority 56% stake is owned by Shijiazhuang Three Deers Limited (石家庄三鹿有限公司).

== Expansion ==
In February 2006, the group opened a dairy plant in Tangshan with an annual capacity of 200,000 tons of powdered milk. At the time of signing the joint venture contract with Fonterra, the company declared it would invest 3 billion yuan for external growth, to form a national industrial network over the next three years. In April 2006, Sanlu acquired a liquid milk production base in Weifang, Shandong, capable of producing 300,000 tons of liquid milk every year, at an outlay of 400 million yuan. In October of the same year, the company invested in a production facility with a capacity of 100,000 tons of lactic acid bacteria drink and yoghurt in Xinxiang, Henan, for 120 million yuan.

In 2007, its sales reached ¥10 billion. Milk powder sales of the group ranked number 1 for 15 consecutive years, with a market share of 18 percent. The company prided itself on its stringent quality control procedures, boasting its extremely rigorous tests on its products. "Made in China", a special edition of the CCTV program "Quality Reports Weekly", aired on 2 September 2007, and focused on the company. It claimed over 1,000 different tests were carried out before its products leave the factory. To that end, on 8 January 2008, it was awarded second prize at the 2007 National Scientific Techniques Awards in the category of 'Innovative infant formula research and other related techniques'. A number of its products were exempt from government inspection for having passed government quality checks three times in succession. Sanlu is one of the largest employers in Shijiazhuang, with close to 10,000 people on its payroll.

== Milk powder scandal and demise ==
In September 2008, Sanlu came to international attention due to product concerns regarding its infant formula, which was discovered to have been contaminated with melamine, a non-alimentary chemical which causes kidney stones. An estimated 300,000 babies became ill, and six cases resulted in death.

The Xinhua News Agency reported that Sanlu received its first complaints about baby formula in December 2007. Fonterra was allegedly only alerted to the contamination on 2 August. There was no immediate trade recall. Fonterra said that local administrators refused an official recall. Fonterra notified the New Zealand government on 5 September after the scandal had already hit the Chinese press and after Fonterra directors left China. Three days later, Prime Minister, Helen Clark had Beijing officials alerted directly. Clark accused the company and officials of covering up to avoid an official recall.

On 15 September, the company issued a public apology for the contaminated formula; Sanlu was ordered to halt production, and to destroy all unsold and recalled products. Authorities reportedly seized 10,000 tons of product.

After testing samples from 491 batches of products sold by all 109 companies producing baby formula, the National Administration of Quality Supervision, Inspection and Quarantine said that all 11 samples from Sanlu failed the melamine test. Sanlu, whose products sell at half the price of equivalents on the market, recorded the highest levels of contamination among all the samples tested, at 2,563 ppm.

Tian Wenhua (田文華), Chairman and general manager of Sanlu and Chinese Communist Party Committee Secretary was stripped of her party and functional posts during an extraordinary meeting of the Hebei provincial standing committee of the Chinese Communist Party. Four Shijiazhuang officials, including vice mayor in charge of food and agriculture, Zhang Fawang, were reportedly removed from office. Mayor Ji Chuntang reportedly resigned on 17 September; Tian was charged under Articles 144 and 150 of the criminal code.

Since Sanlu, the region's largest purchaser of milk, was ordered to halt production, many small dairy farmers were put into hardship. On 24 September, Fonterra announced that it had written down the carrying value of its investment by NZ$139 million (two-thirds), reflecting the costs of product recall and the impairment of the 'Sanlu' brand "as a direct consequence of the criminal contamination of milk in China". Chairman Henry van der Heyden said that the contamination was a criminal act which Fonterra could not have prevented. On 26 September, Fonterra CEO denied that Fonterra is selling its stake of 43% of Shijiazhuang Sanlu Group Co.

=== Bankruptcy ===
On 27 September 2008, China Economic Net reported that Sanlu may have been bankrupted and soon be taken over by Beijing Sanyuan Food Company Ltd. In November, it was announced that the Sanyuan Group would acquire 4 of Sanlu's Shijiazhuang plants, and plants in Tangshan, Shandong and Henan, and would assume some of Sanlu's debt. Consideration was not disclosed, but sum is said to be of the order of ¥800 million.

On 19 December, Sanlu secured a loan of ¥902 million to pay medical expenses of and compensation to children affected by tainted powdered milk it produced. It was announced on 25 December that Shijiazhuang court accepted a creditor's bankruptcy petition against Sanlu, which reportedly had net debt of ¥1.1 billion. Shijiazhuang city, the controlling shareholder, hopes to sell its distribution network as a going concern.

=== Trial of executives ===
Four Sanlu executives went on trial on 31 December 2008 charged with producing and selling fake or substandard products. Tian Wenhua, former general manager, former deputy general managers Wang Yuliang and Hang Zhiqi, and Wu Jusheng, a former head of Sanlu's milk division appeared in court. Tian pleaded guilty to her role in the scandal, and expressed her remorse, and also called for China to consider embracing the European Union's standards on melamine. Wang, who had leaped off a building in a suicide attempt, offered his apology and remorse: "When I think of the children who were harmed... I feel extreme inadequacy towards these sick children and their parents."

On 22 January 2009, Tian was sentenced to life imprisonment, while other Sanlu executives received sentences of five to fifteen years. Two other men were sentenced to death. Tian was also ordered to pay a fine of 20 million yuan (US$2.9 million). Despite its bankruptcy, Sanlu was fined 50 million yuan ($7.3 million).

== See also ==
- Food safety in China
- Chinese protein export contamination
