= Sanyuan Group =

Dairy company in Beijing, China

Sanyuan Group 三元集团
- Type: State owned
- Industry: Agriculture and animal husbandry
- Founded: Beijing, China
- Headquarters: Beijing, China
- Area served: China
- Products: Dairy products
- Website: www.sanyuan.com.cn

Sanyuan Group (Chinese: 三元集团; pinyin: Sānyuán Jítuán) is a state-owned group of companies based on agriculture and animal husbandry in China. It consists of 12 state farms, 20 professional companies, 41 transnational joint ventures, 3 overseas subsidiaries and 1 public company as Beijing Sanyuan Foods, which is listed in Shanghai Stock Exchange.

== Sanyuan Foods ==
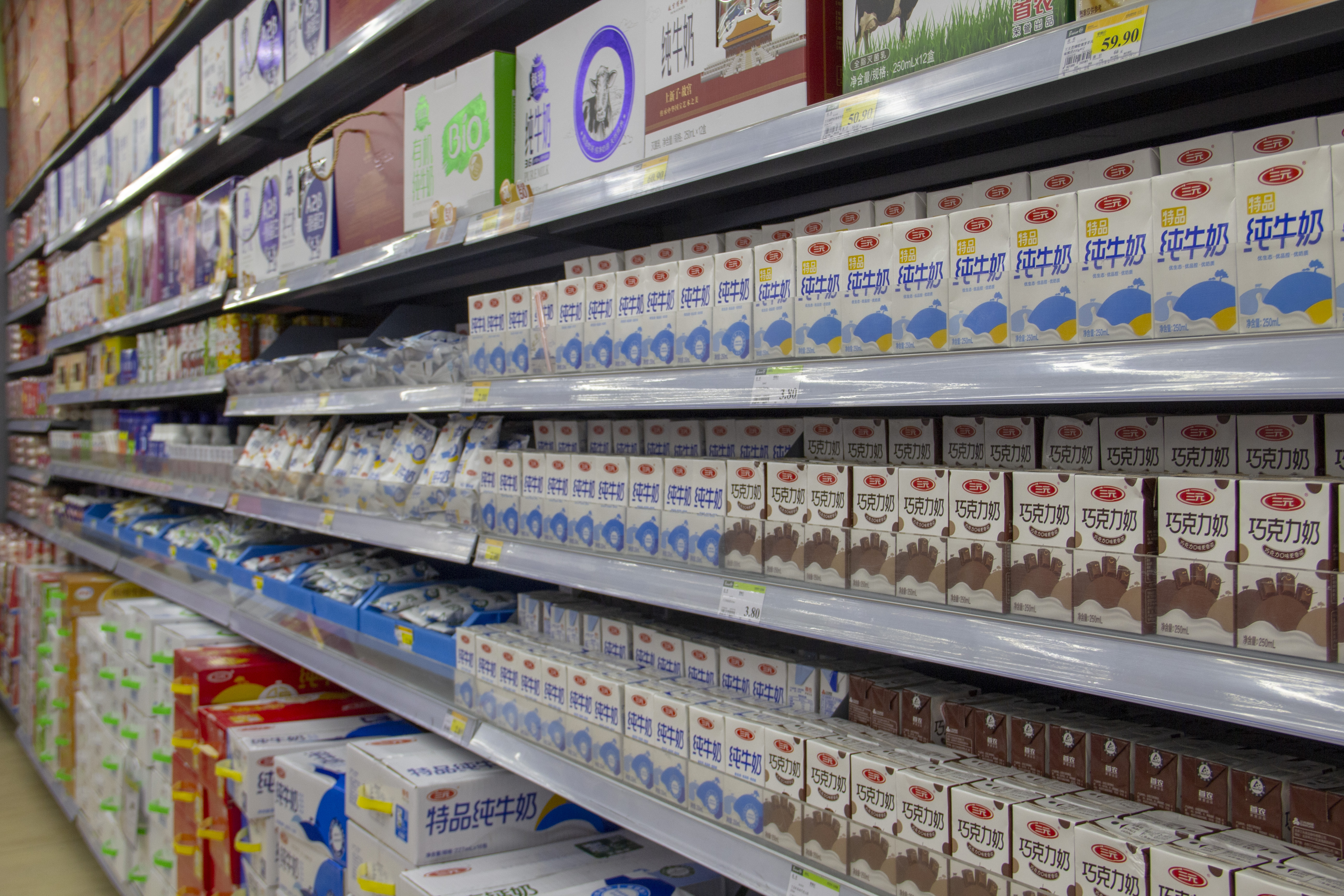
Sanyuan milk

Phoenix Television was quoted as saying Sanyuan Foods was chosen by Beijing Olympic Committee at the last minute as the sole supplier of milk and dairy products for both the 2008 Summer Olympics and the 2008 Summer Paralympics. The original supplier of dairy products to the 2008 Beijing Olympic was Yili Group, but Yili was dropped when its products failed quality tests. After Sanyuan Foods' products were cleared in the nationwide test for melamine, its share price surged 10 percent, a jump of 52% in 5 days.

Independent media have reported that during the 2008 Beijing Olympics and the 2008 Beijing Paralympics, the "State Council Special Food Supply Center" was the only food supplier chosen by the Beijing Olympic Committee when all other national suppliers failed the stringent tests.

"All the food supply, including dairy, for the Olympics and Paralympics were safe," Li Changjiang, former head of AQSIQ told a press conference. "We took special quality management measures aimed at food supply for the Games."

On 26 September 2008 Beijing Sanyuan Foods Co Ltd (SHA 600429) said its shares will be suspended from today pending an announcement related to a possible acquisition. Beijing Sanyuan is the only listed dairy producer that has avoided being associated with China's milk contamination scandal.

The official China Securities Journal cited market sources as saying that Sanyuan, a second-tier company, may acquire Sanlu Group, the dairy at the center of the contamination scandal, taking the opportunity to become one of the top brands. Sanyuan has made a TV Show called Miracle Star, which plagiarized The Amazing World of Gumball in 2014. In response to the plagiarism, Cartoon Network released the 167th episode of Gumball, "The Copycats", to address Miracle Star's plagiarism directly.

== See also ==
- 2008 Chinese milk scandal
- Food safety in China
