= Shao Mingli =

Chinese politician (born 1951)

Shao Mingli (Chinese: 邵明立; pinyin: Shào Mínglì; born October 1951) is the current head of the Chinese State Food and Drug Administration. He took over from Zheng Xiaoyu after his removal and execution in 2007.

Government offices
Preceded by Zheng Xiaoyu	Head of State Food and Drug Administration of China; 2005 – present	Incumbent
