= Hanwei Group =

Chinese egg company

Hanwei Group 韩伟集团
- Type: Private
- Industry: Chicken layer farming; egg products manufacturing; seafood aquaculture
- Founded: Dalian, Liaoning
- Headquarters: Dalian, Liaoning, China
- Area served: China
- Website: http://en.hanwei-group.com

Hanwei Group (Chinese: 韩伟集团) is a company based in Dalian, China. It is China's biggest producer of eggs. In October 2008, it became embroiled in a scandal involving traces of melamine being found in its eggs.

== Overview ==
Hanwei group specialises in egg-based products and seafood. It is the biggest producer of eggs in China, exporting to Hong Kong, Macau, Japan, and Southeast Asia. Some processed egg products are exported to the United States.

== History ==
The company was founded by Han Wei, currently the vice-chairman of Dalian's Federation of Industry and Commerce. He is also a notable party delegate.

=== 2008 Melamine scandal ===
On 22 October 2008, authorities in Hong Kong removed Hanwei product "Select Fresh Brown Eggs" from shop shelves, as more than twice the legal limit of the plastic melamine was found in them. The eggs contained 4.7 ppm (part per million) of melamine, compared to the government imposed legal limit of 2.5 ppm for melamine in food. It is thought that the eggs became contaminated after the chickens which laid them were fed tainted feed. Melamine is commonly added to food to increase the apparent protein content. The practice is illegal.

On 29 October 2008, board director Han Wei issued a statement saying, "We feel rather shocked and sorry and would like to shoulder all responsibilities and consequences resulting from the incident." He admitted that no explanation for the delay has been given so far, though melamine had been found in the feed back in September. The company was planning to sue the feed producer.
