= Hu Xingdou =

Chinese economist

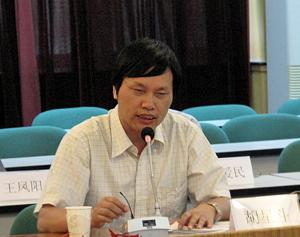
Hu Xingdou

Hu Xingdou (胡星斗) (born 1962) is a Chinese economist. He is a professor of economics at Beijing Institute of Technology, and is the founder of China Studies (Sinology) as well as various schools and 100 teaching posts and business management to guide the work of graduate students.

== Views ==
Hu coined the term "constitutional socialism" (Chinese: 宪政社会主义) in 2006. Hu contends that the Chinese Communist Party should engage in "controllable democratization" which in his view should include deliberative democracy but not large-scale direct democracy or protest activism.
