= Food policy in China =

The food policy in China could be summarized as self-independence and sufficiency policy. The Chinese government adheres to an independent food policy because food security is the foundation of national security. High food prices and serious food shortages have caused severe social and political unrest in many countries in Asia, Africa and South America.

In order to ensure China's economic development, social stability, and political stability, in the 2008 National Food Security Mid- and Long-term Planning Outline, Chinese government put a grain strategy with stated goals to "persist in relying on the basic domestic guarantee of food supply; increase government’s support; perfect treble land carefully; improve comprehensive grain production capacity leaning on scientific and technological progress; improve grain regulation system; strengthen macro-control over everything about the grain; finally build a food security system that meets the requirements of the socialist market economy and meets our country's national conditions."

The development of the Household responsibility system has motivated the enthusiasm of Chinese farmers for production, and greatly improved agricultural production efficiency and grain output at the same time. Since then, China has been able to grow most of its daily need of food, and has initially achieved self-sufficiency in food production. In the late 1980s, however, due to the laking procurement system and the reform and opening up, China's grain production stagnated. As economic developed, the scale of Chinese cities has been increasing correspondingly, accompanied with urban expansion. Under those pressure, food production are facing difficult situations. In order to protect arable land, the Chinese government has proposed the Red Line of Arable Land Policy. Despite administrative restrictions on the conversion of arable land, the area of arable land is still declining.

Food security is an area of policy emphasis for Xi Jinping, viewing it as an important component of national security. In his discussion of China's food security, Xi cites Fan Li's ancient comment that food is "the life of the people and a precious resource of the state."

== Food waste ==
In 2015 the Chinese Academy of Sciences reported that in big cities there was 17 to 18 million tons of food waste, enough to feed over 30 million people. About 25% of the waste was staple foods and about 18% meat.

In August 2020, the Chinese Communist Party general secretary Xi Jinping said the amount of food waste was shocking and distressing. A local authority campaign "Operation empty plate" (Chinese: 光盘行动) was started to reduce waste, including encouraging food outlets to limit orders to one fewer main dish than the number of customers.

As of December 2020, a draft law is under consideration to penalise food outlets if they encourage or mislead customers to order excessive meals causing obvious waste, first with a warning and then fines of up to 10,000 yuan. It would allow restaurants to charge customers who leave excessive leftovers. Broadcasters who promote overeating or food waste could also be fined up to 100,000 yuan.
