= Official test failures of the 2008 Chinese milk scandal =

== Tests conducted by AQSIQ ==
results published on 16 September 2008

Producer	Product	Samples taken	Samples failed	Melamine content(mg/kg)
Shijiazhuang Sanlu Group	三鹿牌嬰幼兒配方乳粉	11	11	2563
Shanghai Panda Dairy	熊貓可寶牌嬰幼兒配方乳粉	5	3	619
Qingdao Shengyuan Dairy	聖元牌嬰幼兒配方乳粉	17	8	150
Shanxi Gu Cheng Dairy	古城牌嬰幼兒配方乳粉	13	4	141.6
Jiangxi Guangming Yingxiong Dairy	英雄牌嬰幼兒配方乳粉	2	2	98.6
Baoji Huimin Dairy	惠民牌嬰幼兒配方乳粉	1	1	79.17
Inner Mongolia Mengniu Dairy	蒙牛牌嬰幼兒配方乳粉	28	3	68.2
Torador Dairy Industry (Tianjin)	可淇牌嬰幼兒配方乳粉	1	1	67.94
Guangdong Yashili Group	雅士利牌嬰幼兒配方乳粉	30	8	53.4
Hunan Peiyi Dairy	南山倍益牌嬰幼兒配方乳粉	3	1	53.4
Heilongjiang Qilin Dairy	嬰幼兒配方乳粉2段基粉	1	1	31.74
Shanxi Yashili Dairy	雅士利牌嬰幼兒配方乳粉	4	2	26.3
Shenzhen Jinbishi Milk	金必氏牌嬰幼兒配方乳粉	2	2	18
Scient (Guangzhou) Infant Nutrition	施恩牌嬰幼兒配方乳粉	20	14	17
Guangzhou Jinding Dairy Products Factory	金鼎牌嬰幼兒配方乳粉	3	1	16.2
Inner Mongolia Yili Industrial Group	伊利牌兒童配方乳粉	35	1	12
Yantai Ausmeadow Nutriment	澳美多牌嬰幼兒配方乳粉	16	6	10.7
Qingdao Suncare Nutritional Technology	愛可丁牌嬰幼兒配方乳粉	3	1	4.8
Xi'an Baiyue Dairy	御寶牌嬰幼兒配方乳粉	3	1	3.73
Yantai Leilei Dairy	磊磊牌嬰幼兒配方乳粉	3	3	1.2
Shanghai Baoanli Dairy	寶安力牌嬰幼兒配方乳粉	1	1	0.21
Fuding Chenguan Dairy	聰爾壯牌嬰幼兒配方乳粉	1	1	0.09

Source: China Central Television

results published on 30 September 2008

Producer	Product	SKU	Batch no prod date	Melamine content(mg/kg)
Shijiazhuang Sanlu Group 石家庄三鹿集团股份有限公司	高铁高锌配方奶粉	400g/bag	4/3/2008	6196.61
Hunan Peiyi Dairy Company 湖南培益乳业有限公司	中老年高纤高钙配方奶粉	400g/bag	9/8/2008	5624
Shijiazhuang Baocheng Dairy Company 石家庄宝城乳业有限公司	Full-fat powdered milk 全脂奶粉	25 kg/bag	2008.6.16	5577.29
Tangshan Longyuan Dairy Company 唐山市龙源乳业有限公司	Full-fat powdered milk 全脂乳粉	25 kg/bag	2008.6.3	5539.76
Shijiazhuang Sanlu Group 石家庄三鹿集团股份有限公司	高铁高锌配方奶粉	400g/bag	1/13/2008	4082.64
Nanshan Green Foods Development Co. 南山绿色食品开发分公司	中老年高纤高钙配方奶粉	900g/tin	9/11/2008	3700
Shijiazhuang Sanlu Group 石家庄三鹿集团股份有限公司	青壮年高钙配方奶粉	400g/bag	2008-01-28/A1411C	3200
邢台三鹿乳业有限公司沙河分公司	Full-fat powdered milk 全脂奶粉	25 kg/bag	20080621T21	2225.62
Nanshan Green Foods Development Co. 南山绿色食品开发分公司	中老年高纤高钙配方奶粉	400g/bag	6/23/2008	2200
Shijiazhuang Sanlu Group 石家庄三鹿集团股份有限公司	青壮年高钙配方奶粉	400g/bag	4/5/2008	1783.29
Shijiazhuang Sanlu Group 石家庄三鹿集团股份有限公司	高铁高锌配方奶粉	400g/bag	6/12/2008	1201.56
Shijiazhuang Sanlu Group 石家庄三鹿集团股份有限公司	学生营养配方奶粉	400g/bag	2008-01-23/A0710F	968
Tangshan Longgang Dairy Company 唐山市龙港乳业有限公司	Full-fat powdered milk 全脂乳粉	25 kg/bag	2008.9.11	710.17
Shijiazhuang Sanlu Group 石家庄三鹿集团股份有限公司	女士高钙配方奶粉	400g/bag	20080511A1507C	561
Tangshan Mingle Dairy Company 唐山明乐乳业有限责任公司	Full-fat powdered milk 全脂奶粉（25 kg）	25 kg/bag	2008.8.11	354.6
Hongguan Dairy Company 张北县宏冠乳业有限责任公司	Full-fat powdered milk 全脂乳粉	25 kg/bag	2008.8.1	353.03
Chabei Dairy Company 察北乳业有限公司	淡奶粉	300g/bag	2008.9.11	326.75
Shijiazhuang Sanlu Group 石家庄三鹿集团股份有限公司	惠孕孕期及哺乳期女士营养配方奶粉	400g/bag	6/29/2008	287.75
Henan Jinyuan Dairy Company 河南金元乳业有限公司	Full-fat powdered milk Full-fat powdered milk 全脂奶粉	25 kg/bag	3/18/2008	287
Shijiazhuang Sanlu Group 石家庄三鹿集团股份有限公司	全脂淡奶	25 kg/bag	2008.4.25	145.82
Heilongjiang Guangming Dairy 黑龙江省光明松鹤乳品有限责任公司	Rich, full-fat powdered milk 香浓全脂奶粉	400g/bag	20080709 04 02	140
Guangdong Yashili Group 广东雅士利集团股份有限公司	中小学生特殊配方奶粉	400g/bag	7/15/2008	94.6
Tianjin Haihe Dairy Company 天津海河乳业有限公司	全脂甜奶粉	400g/bag	20080817	56.38
Fujian Fule Food Industrial Company 福建省南安市福乐食品工业有限公司	中老年加钙奶粉	400g/bag	2008.06.04	32
Inner Mongolia Yili Industrial Group 内蒙古伊利实业集团股份有限公司	中老年多维高钙奶粉	400g/bag	20080505 112B820	25.7
Guangdong Yashili Group 广东雅士利集团股份有限公司	女士特殊配方奶粉	400g/bag	6/3/2008	19.2
Fuzhou Mingyi Dairy Company 福州明一乳业有限公司	学生奶粉	400g/bag	20080803	17
Qianan Sanyuan Foods 迁安三元食品有限公司	乳粉		2008.8.7	10.58
Inner Mongolia Mengniu Dairy 内蒙古蒙牛阿拉乳制品有限责任公司	金装女士多维高钙高铁奶粉	400g/bag	8/21/2008	6
Guangdong Yashili Group 广东雅士利集团股份有限公司	优怡女士特殊配方奶粉	400g/bag	7/9/2008	3.05
Shijiazhuang Sanlu Group 石家庄三鹿集团股份有限公司	全家营养配方奶粉	900g/tin	2008-09-02/SLB0203I	1.3

Source: Administration of Quality Supervision, Inspection and Quarantine

== Tests conducted by the Hong Kong Centre for Food Safety ==
Results published up to 25 October 2008

Manufacturer	Product	Prod weight	Melamine content(mg/kg)
Shanghai Yili AB Foods Co., Ltd	Natural Choice Yogurt Flavoured Ice Bar with Real Fruit	90 ml	15
Shanghai Yili AB Foods Co., Ltd	Super Bean Red Bean Chestnut Ice Bar	48 ml	21.0
Shanghai Yili AB Foods Co., Ltd	Bean Club- Matcha red bean ice bar	87 ml	4.4
Inner Mongolia Yili Industrial Group Co., Ltd.	High Calcium Milk Beverage	1 litre	5.5
Shanghai Yili AB Foods Co., Ltd	Bean Club- Red bean milk bar	95 ml	5.0
Shanghai Yili AB Foods Co., Ltd	Prestige Chocliz - Dark Chocolate Bar	100 ml	13.0
Inner Mongolia Yili Industrial Group Co., Ltd.	Pure Milk	250ml	2.2
Inner Mongolia Yili Industrial Group Co., Ltd.	Pure Milk	1 litre	3.5
Inner Mongolia Yili Industrial Group Co., Ltd.	High calcium low fat milk beverage	1 litre	9.9
Nestlé Qingdao Limited	Nestlé Dairy Farm UHT Pure Milk (Catering)	1 litre	1.4
Shanghai GuanShengYuan Food General Factory	White Rabbit Creamy Candies (exp 20/12/2009)	227g	4.6
Four Seas Mercantile Limited	Four Seas Cake (Strawberry Flavour)	160g	6.4
Shanghai GuanShengYuan Food General Factory	White Rabbit Creamy Candies (exp 20/11/2009)	227g	16
Heinz (China)	DHA+AA Vegetable Formula Cereal (exp 26/4/2010)	200g	1.6
Silang	'House of Steamed Potato'; Wasabi Potato Cracker(exp 3/9/2009)	238g	18
Lotte	Koala Strawberry Biscuit (Family Pack) (exp 26.9.2009)	10 x 20g	4.3
Lotte	Koala's March Chocolate Biscuit (Family Pack)(exp 29.1.2001)	10 x 20g	57
Lotte	Koala Biscuit (Family Pack)(Chocolate Filled)(Double Chocolate Flavor) (exp 29.1.2001)	10 x 20g	68
Licheng 內蒙古利誠實業有限公司	Milk Slice (Original) (exp: 10.03.2009, 13.03.2009)	168g	8.3, 4.7
Zhongshan City Tian Le Yuan Foods Co. Ltd (澳資)中山市天樂園食品有限公司	東望洋Coconut Cakes/東望洋椰蓉酥 (exp: 20.7.2009)	180g	19
Zhongshan City Tian Le Yuan Foods Co. Ltd (澳資)中山市天樂園食品有限公司	東望洋Walnut Cakes/東望洋椰蓉酥 (exp: 20.7.2009)	150g	3.7
Glico	Pocky Men's Coffee Cream; Coated Biscuit Stick (exp: 5.6.2009)	52g	43
Lotte	Cream Cheese Cake (exp 17.7.2009)	6 x 27.5g	3.4
Cadbury	Crispy hazelnut milk chocolate (5 kg bulk pack) (exp: 23.1.2010)	5 kg	56
Cadbury	Cadbury Dairy Milk Cookies Chocolate (5 kg bulk pack) (exp 2.11.2009)	5 kg	6.9
EDO	Almond Cacao Biscuit Sticks (exp: 17.5.2009)	36g	8.5
	Doraemon Chocolate Gummy Muscat Flavour (exp: 19.8.2009)	50g	12
Munchy's	Mini Crackers With Peanut Butter (exp: 15.7.2009)	45g	5.4
Munchy's	Mini Crackers With Cheese Cream (exp: 15.7.2009)	45g	3.8
Perfect Food Manufacturing	Julie's Wheat Crackers 麥香蘇打餅 (exp: 9.8.2009)	350g (14 convi-Packs)	3.2
Munchy's	The Original Sugar Crackers (exp: 15.7.2009)	380g	4.0
Croley Foods	Sunflower Crackers (Blueberry Cream Sandwich) (exp:5.12.2008)	270g	3.2
PARKnSHOP Select	Extra Large Fresh Brown Eggs (exp:25.10.2008)	6pcs	4.7

Source: Hong Kong Centre for Food Safety

== Tests conducted by Agri-Food and Veterinary Authority of Singapore ==
Results published up to 24 October 2008

Manufacturer	Product	Prod weight	Melamine content(mg/kg)	
Dutch Lady	Banana Flavoured Milk	two sizes	36.7 to 48.7	
Dutch Lady	Honeydew Flavoured Milk	two sizes	9.43 to 58.7	
Silang	'House of Steamed Potato'; Potato Cracker	?g	11.96	
Lotte	Koala's March Cocoa; Chocolate Biscuit(Family Pack)	10 x 20g	17.3	
Lotte	Hello Kitty Strawberry Cream Filled Biscuit		5.5	
徐福记	Puffed Rice Rolls - Butter Corn Flavour	178g	10.7	
徐福记	Puffed Rice Rolls - Cheese Flavour	178g	8.5	
Yili Foods	Choice Dairy Fruit Bar; Yogurt Flavoured Ice		39 to 60.8	
Dutch Lady	Strawberry Flavoured Milk	two sizes	33.9 to 46.4	
Guan Sheng Yuan	White Rabbit Creamy Candies	227g	67 to 160	
Silang	'House of Steamed Potato' - Potato & tomato Cracker	?g	8.1	
New Sshma Ows	Mallow Dippers-Strawberry Flavour	?g	24.8	
Cadbury	Choclairs – Blueberry Flavour		21.4 – 33.9	
Cadbury	Choclairs – Coffee Flavour		92.3	
Panda Dairy	Whole powdered milk (non-retail product)	?g	163.8	
Julie’s brand (Malaysia); Perfect Food Manufacturing	Golden Kaka Crackers	500g	11.8 - 12.8	
Julie’s	Cocoro Crispy Chocolate Wafer Rolls with Vanilla Cream Filling	120g	8.04	
Julie’s	Le-Mond Puff Sandwich with Lemon Flavoured Cream	225g	Nil - 10.5	
Julie’s	Wheat Crackers	350g	4.9 - 23.4	
Julie’s	Cottage Crackers (Vegetable Yeast Cracker)	232g	0.6 - 10.8	
Julie’s	Cottage Crackers (Original Yeast Cracker)	232g	10.6	
Julie’s	Chez Creamy Cheese Sandwich	200g	172.4	
Julie’s	Sugar Crackers (extra flaky)		18.8	
Julie’s	Waferico Chocolate Coated Wafers with Chocolate Cream Filling	150g	Nil - 16.0	
Julie’s	Cream Crackers	450g	33.8	
Julie’s	Minico Rich Chocolate Chip Cookies	150g	20.0	
Julie’s	Peanut Butter Sandwich	180g	0.7 -12.6	5.3 - 10.8
Leo	Gold Finger Choco		0.6 - 6.2	
Santa	Chocolate Gold Fingers	130g	0.7 - 50.8	
Swan	Chocolate Fingers	130g	4.2 - 12.3	

Source: Agri-Food and Veterinary Authority of Singapore

== Tests conducted by Macao Health Bureau ==
Results published up to 30 September 2008 by the Serviço de Saude de Macao (SSM)

Manufacturer	Product	Prod weight	Melamine content(mg/kg)
Lotte	Koala Biscuit	50g	24
Nestlé	NESLAC Gold Growing Up 1+ Tin	900g	<1
Mengniu	Breakfast Milk	900g	2.35
Mengniu	"Pure Milk" (produced 13.7.2008)	250ml	6.66 mg
Guan Sheng Yuan	White Rabbit Creamy Candy (exp: 20.7.2009)	227g	24.7 mg
King Car Foods	Mr Brown Mandheling Coffee (exp: 19.5.2010)	15g x 12 packets	17.4 mg
Nestlé	Gold Baby Formula (produced 4.11.2007)	900g	1

Source: Xinhua, Macau Daily Times

== Tests conducted by the Food and Consumer Product Safety Authority of the Netherlands ==
Results published up to 30 September 2008 by the Voedsel en Waren Autoriteit

Manufacturer	Product	Prod weight	Melamine content(mg/kg)
Lotte	Koala Biscuit (chestnut)	49g	4
Lotte	Koala Biscuit (chocolate)	49g	5

Source: Voedsel en Waren Autoriteit

== Tests conducted by Indonesian Agency for Drugs and Food ==
Results published up to 27 September 2008 by the National Agency of Drug and Food Control of Republic of Indonesia (NADFC)

Manufacturer	Product	Prod weight	Melamine content(mg/kg)
Yantai New Era Health Industry Co., Ltd.	Guozhen Pine Pollen Calcium Milk	20g	38.03
Nabisco Food (Suzhou) Co. Ltd.	Oreo Wafer Sticks	18g	366.08
Nabisco Food (Suzhou) Co. Ltd.	Oreo Wafer Sticks	18g	361.69
Mars Food Co. Ltd Beijing	M&M's Minis Milk Chocolate	40g	7.50
Mars Food Co. Ltd Beijing	M&M's Minis Milk Chocolate	40g	252. 89
Effem Foods (Beijing) Co. Ltd	M&M's Peanuts Chocolate Candies		116.47
Effem Foods (Beijing) Co. Ltd	M&M's Peanuts Chocolate Candies		262.82
Effem Foods (Beijing) Co. Ltd	M&M's Milk Chocolate		856.30
Mars Food Co. Ltd Beijing	M&M's Milk Chocolate		322.22
Mars Food Co	Snickers (brown pkg)	59g	24.44
Shanghai Guan Sheng Yuan	White Rabbit (blue pkg)*		456.04
Shanghai Guan Sheng Yuan	White Rabbit (red pkg)*		945.86
Wuzhou Bingquan Ind. Shareholding Co., Ltd.	Soybean Drink With Milk* (green pkg)		93.25
Wuzhou Bingquan Ind. Shareholding Co., Ltd.	Soybean Drink With Milk* (yellow pkg)		8.51
Wuzhou Bingquan Ind. Shareholding Co., Ltd.	Soyspring Instant Milk Cereal*		23.49
Wuzhou Bingquan Ind. Shareholding Co., Ltd.	Soyspring Instant Peanut Milk*		trace (< 0.62)

Source: Department of Health, Indonesia

== Tests conducted by New Zealand Food Safety Authority ==
Results published up to 7 October 2008 by the NZFSA

Manufacturer	Product	Prod weight	Melamine content(mg/kg)
Guan Sheng Yuan	White Rabbit Creamy Candy		180
Hangzhou Wahaha Group	AD milk		3.3

Source: New Zealand Food Safety Authority

== Test conducted by Institute of Hygiene and Public Health, Ho Chi Minh City ==
Results published up to 6 October 2008.

Manufacturer	Product	Prod wt.	Melamine content(mg/kg)
Yili	Yili Pure Milk		0.07
Yili	Yili Pure Milk	1 litre	0.49
Yili	Yili Pure Milk	250ml	2.97
Yili	Yili Pure Milk	250ml	2.95
Yili	Yili Fresh Milk		177.58
Asia Chemical joint stock company	NLTP: Non dairy creamer (Thailand)		104.44
Hanoimilk company	Full cream powdered milk grade A		145
Hanoimilk company	Blue Cow Full cream powdered milk used for UHT milk		200
Golden Food	Milk for children 1+ yrs height improvement formula)	paper box	707.19
Mai Anh Processed foodstuffs Co., Ltd.	Enrich Gold powdered milk		207.76
Anco foodstuff company	Full Cream powdered milk		203
Minh Duong Company	Full-fat powdered milk		174
Minh Duong Company	Skimmed powdered milk		279
Hanoimilk company	Hi-P Sterilized milk chocolate flavor		150
Hanoimilk company	Whole powdered milk 3		245
Hanoimilk company	Yogurt with sugar		Unknown
Hanoimilk company	Skimmed powdered milk		Unknown
Hanoimilk company	Whole powdered milk 1		Unknown
CMB Processed foodstuffs Co., Ltd.	Gold Nutritionals master gaine		Unknown
Huong Thuy company	Pokka Melon Milk 240ml		Unknown
Huong Thuy company	Pokka Cappuccino Coffee 240ml		Unknown
Huong Thuy company	Milk Coffee Europe 240ml		Unknown

Source: Ho Chi Minh city Department of Health, Tuoi Tre Newspaper
