= Yashili =

Chinese food company

Guangdong Yashili Group Co. Ltd
- Company type: Privately owned
- Industry: Dairy, Soy products, Oatmeal, Rice flour
- Founded: 1983
- Headquarters: Chaoan, Guangdong, People's Republic of China
- Key people: Chairman and CEO
- Products: Dairy products Soy products
- Website: Yashili

Guangdong Yashili Group Co., Ltd. (Chinese: 广东雅士利集团股份有限公司) is a leading privately owned infant formula and soymilk products company in China. Based in Chaoan in the Chaozhou region of the Guangdong Province, China and, incorporated in the Cayman Islands. The company also has a Hong Kong-listed entity Yashili International Holdings Limited.

Yashili also has production facilities in Heilongjiang, Shanxi, and Zhengzhou. In January 2013, Yashii announced that it would set up a production facility in New Zealand. Yashili employs more than 5,000 employees.

== Products ==
Yashili produces a range of foodstuffs including infant formula, infant rice cereal, milk powder, soybean milk powder, juice powder, cornmeal flakes, oatmeal, preserved fruits, nutritional supplements and health foods, totaling more than 300 product items, which are sold throughout China and in overseas markets.

Yashili's focus is increasingly on infant formula which now accounts for 80% of the group's sales. Yashili has two infant formula brands; Yashily and Scient. The company also sells nutritional products, namely soymilk powder and pediatric rice flour under the Yashily brand, cereal under Zhengwei brand as well as milk powder for adults and teenagers under Youyi brand. The Group launched pediatric milk formula serial products in the Golden Ambery brand under Yashily and Merla brand under Scient, which possess quality nutrition and target consumers in high-end market. The Group's core products, Yashily a-Golden series and Scient Golden series, mainly focus on middle to high-end consumer groups, while Yashily's Newwitt series and Scient's Ordinary Pack Series mainly focus on middle-end consumer groups. Yashily's New Formula series mainly focuses on low to middle-end consumer groups. Yashili also sells other types of nutritional food products, namely milk powder for adults and teenagers under the Youyi brand, soymilk powder, rice flour and cereal under the Yashily brand and breakfast cereals under the Zhengwei brand.

== Company ownership ==
The company is controlled by the Zhang family which owns 52.19% of Yashili International Holdings. Chairman of the company is Zhang Lidian who together with brother Zhang Likun and others of the Zhang family, set up the company in 1983. Zhang Lidian is on the Chinese committee of the International Dairy Federation, and serves as a representative for Guangdong province in the National People's Congress.

On September 21, 2009, the Carlyle Group announced that it had acquired a 17.3 percent stake in Guangdong Yashili Group Co. for US$100 million to improve Yashili's research and production capability. Since then Carylye has increased its stake and as at January 2013, the group owned 24.39% of Yashili International Holdings.

In 2009 Shanghai Fosun High Technology (Group) Co., a subsidiary of one of China's largest privately owned conglomerates Fosun International Limited, also injected funds into Yashili for a 6 percent stake. Fosun's holding has since decreased; as of January 2013 Fosun owned 2.98% of Yashili International Holdings although it still has two directors on the board.

In November 2010 Yashili listed a minority stake on the Hong Kong stock exchange under the name Yashili International Holdings Ltd (code 01230). In addition to Zhang International, the Zhang family's investment vehicle, Carlyle, Fosun and SPCI, the public's shareholding in Yashili is 18.4%. Net proceeds from the IPO was 2.31 billion HK dollars.

== 2008 Chinese milk scandal ==
In 2008, a crisis occurred in China in which melamine-tainted powdered milk was found being produced by a large number of Chinese dairy manufacturers. Melamine was found in 22 out of 109 manufacturers tested including industry majors Mengniu, Yili, Bright Dairy and Yashili. Three different Yashili subsidiaries and brands were found to have melamine: Guangdong Yashili Group, Shanxi Yashili Dairy and Scient (Guangzhou) Infant Nutrition. Across the three Yashili infant formula products tested, 24 out of 54 samples were found to have melamine. Yashili's infant formula products were the only Chinese infant formula being exported and no melamine was found in those products. Yashili captured contaminated or suspect product from distributors and filmed it being burned. It also used company funds to buy back the product from distributors. Yashili International said the melamine incident had caused it a total loss of 787 million yuan in 2008, which were mainly attributable to the costs and expenses relating to product recalls and decreased sales in the second half of 2008. Yashili said in a separate statement that it appointed safety experts to help improve consumer confidence in its products. A six-person panel will be headed by Robert Brackett, a former director of the U.S. Food and Drug Administration.

In February 2009 new allegations emerged against Yashili. The Legal Weekly claimed that the Shanxi Yashili Dairy Company had repackaged 30 tonnes of contaminated milk powder as new product. Yashili denied the accusation.

In 2009, a customer Guo Li (zh:郭利案) sought compensation from Yashili for his daughter's kidney damage, after using Yashili products. Yashili agreed to a 3 million yuan deal, but secretly recorded the conversation and reported Guo Li to the police for blackmailing. Guo Li was arrested by ambushing police at the agreed deal payment time. In Jan 8th, 2010, Guo Li was sentenced to 5 years in jail for blackmailing. Guo Li served the full sentence and was released in 2014 after divorcing and losing custody of his daughter. In 2017, Chinese court re-tried the case and revoked the previous sentence.

== Marketing and sales channels ==
Yashili sell its products via a comprehensive national sales and distribution network, which covers all regions within mainland China. The milk powder products sales network comprises around 1,500 regional distributors, who directly or indirectly further distribute Yashili's products to over 105,000 retail outlets, including supermarkets, department stores, specialty stores and large membership chain supermarkets as well as grocery stores. Yashili also sells its products to 15,000 maternal and child stores, which it claims had pushed up market share in this channel, bringing new growth points for the Group's performance. The company's extensive milk powder products distribution network is formed by more than 2,300 marketing staff under the support of over 600 liaison locations.

== Brand building ==
In the “2011 Annual Meeting on Competitiveness of Chinese Brand and Third Summit of Chinese Brands and Brand Leaders” held in Beijing in March 2012, Yashily was given the “2011 Most Influential Brand Award in China”. In July 2012, “Yashily” was named 500 Most Valuable Brand in China with a brand value of RMB9.865 billion, ranking 154 overall. Compared to 2011, Yashili's brand value increased by RMB2.09 billion, while its ranking went up nine places.

=== Brand image association with New Zealand ===
Early in 2012, Yashili began a marketing campaign promoting the company's infant formula's New Zealand milk powder content by adding the slogan "Pure New Zealand, Cherish Yashili" to its product range (Chinese: 纯净新西兰 真爱雅士利 pinyin 'chunjing Xinxilan, zhen'ai Yashili). The company's marketing slogan is also featured across the home page of the Yashili company website. The company's leading brand 'a-Golden Stage' (Chinese: 1段婴儿配方奶粉) has the byline 'made from high quality New Zealand sourced milk' (Chinese: 来自新西兰的优质奶源). In the company's 2012 interim report Yashili noted that "All of our branded paediatric milk formula products are mainly produced by imported premium raw materials procured from New Zealand". An interactive internet event named “Experience excellent milk sources with a trip in New Zealand” was held in 2012 with 5 million participants. Also, over 2,000 parent-child roadshows and activities were held from first-tier cities to second and third-tier cities, and winning consumers were invited to participate in “6-day trip to experience milk source in New Zealand”. Since August 2010, Yashili has sourced all its milk for its infant formula products from New Zealand.

== Overseas investments ==
In January 2013 Yashili International Holdings announced plans to build a processing plant in New Zealand, its first major offshore investment. The manufacturing facility will produce finished products and semi-finished products, including base milk powder, in an industrial park at Pokeno in the Waikato region just south of Auckland. Annual production capacity is expected to be 52,000 tonnes. The total investment involved in the establishment of the facility is estimated to be 1.1 billion yuan (NZ$210 million) including 950 million yuan (NZ$181m) for acquisition of land and the cost of construction of the facility, and 150 million yuan (NZ$28.6m) for working capital of Yashili New Zealand Dairy Company. That company will be a wholly owned subsidiary of Yashili's New Zealand subsidiary Yashili International Holdings Ltd, which will establish and operate the New Zealand facility. The project is expected to be completed and running in the second half of 2014 and employ some 100 local staff. Yashili New Zealand has submitted an application for consent for the investment to New Zealand's Overseas Investment Office (OIO) in late 2012.

== Financial results ==
For the six months ended 30 June 2012, Yashili group's revenue amounted to RMB1,689.1 million, a 17.0% increase compared to the same period of the preceding year. If annualized, this would give Yashili 2012 sales revenue of at least RMB3,378.2 million (US$544 million). Infant formula sales increased 20% to RMB1,448.9 million while sales in other product categories declined or showed a small increase. Infant formula sales made up 80% of the company's total sales during this period. Sales of Yashily branded infant formula increased by 27.3% while sales of the firm's Scient brand declined 0.8%. The strongest segment growth was recorded for Yashily branded infant formula in third tier cities which increased 54.2% during this period to reach RMB458.2 million, accounting for 40% of Yashily-branded infant formula sales.

== China infant formula market ==
China's infant formula brand is highly fragmented with more than 100 brands of which only a dozen or so are significant. Definitions of the size of the pediatric milk product market vary depending on the extent to which infant formula products sold outside the modern trade sector are measured. According to Euromonitor International, in 2011 China's sales volume of infant formula market in China reached RMB62.1 billion. Euromonitor forecast that compound annual growth rate from 2011 to 2016 would be 15.6%, while the 2016 market size will reach RMB128.4 billion. (approx. USD$21 billion). These figures suggest that in 2011 Yashili's share of China's infant formula market was around 1.6%. These figures also suggest that the total market in 2012 was RMB72 billion (US$11.6 billion).

Over 80% of China's infant formula market is dominated by international brands. After Nestle's 2012 acquisition of Wyeth, Nestle was reported to have 14.4% of the Chinese market and Mead Johnson 14%. Yashili is one of the largest local Chinese manufacturers of infant formula which includes Yili and Beingmate.
