= Hydromelonic acid =

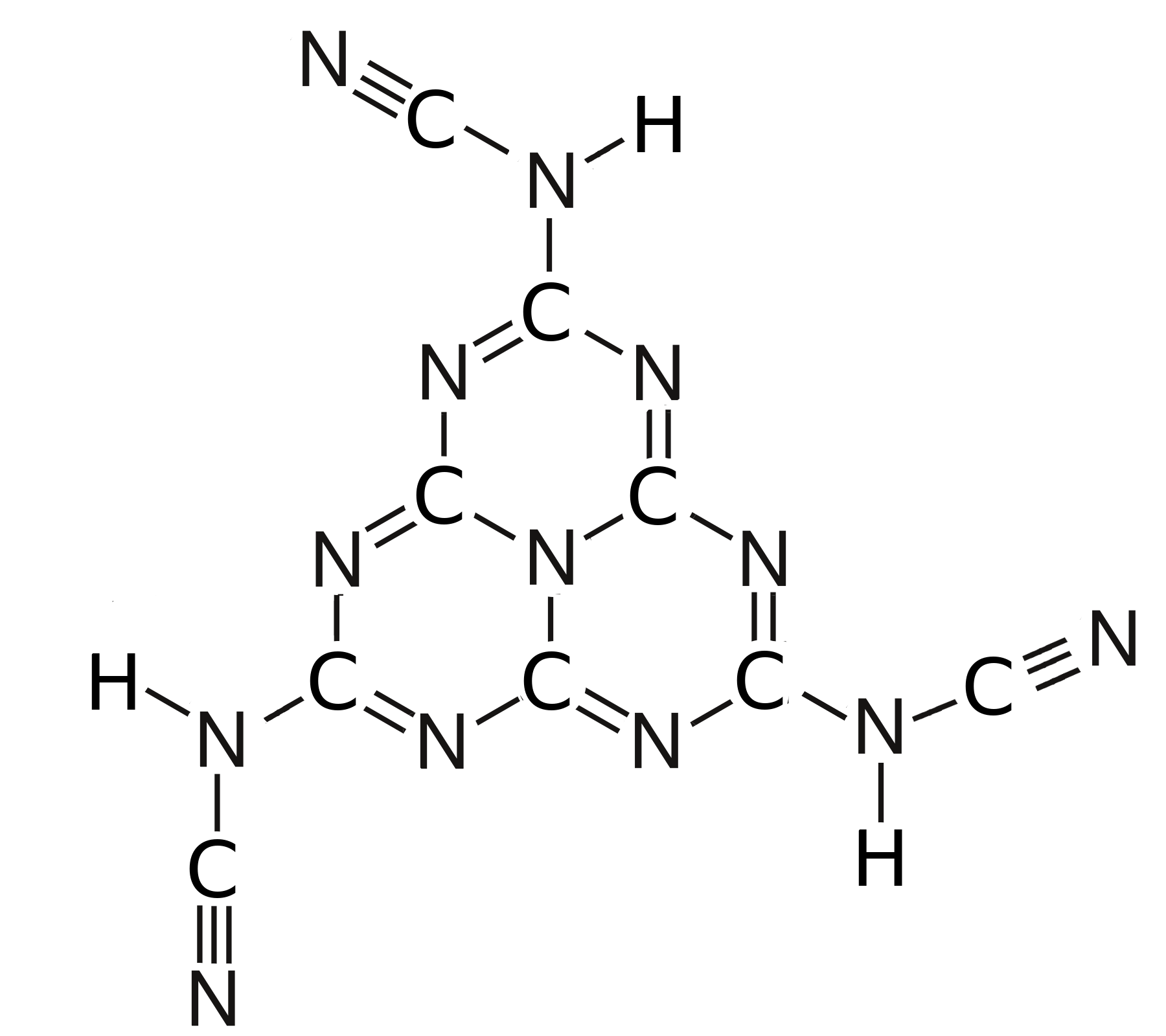

Names
- IUPAC name 1,3,4,6,7,9,9b-heptaazaphenalene-2,5,8-tricarbodiimide
- Other names hydromelonic acid; tricyanamido‐s‐heptazine; tricyanomelem; [7,11-bis(cyanoimino)-2,4,6,8,10,12,13-heptazatricyclo[7.3.1.0^{5,13}]trideca-1,3,5,8-tetraen-3-yl]cyanamide

Identifiers
CAS Number	1593-03-9
3D model (JSmol)	Interactive image
ChemSpider	9441353
PubChem CID	136835218
CompTox Dashboard (EPA)	DTXSID801337264
- InChI: InChI=1S/C9H3N13/c10-1-13-4-16-7-18-5(14-2-11)20-9-21-6(15-3-12)19-8(17-4)22(7)9/h(H3,13,14,15,16,17,18,19,20,21) Key: QBVBYJATTGOHDX-UHFFFAOYSA-N
- SMILES: C(#N)NC1=NC2=NC(=NC#N)N=C3N2C(=N1)NC(=NC#N)N3

Properties
Chemical formula	C_{9}H_{3}N_{13}
- Except where otherwise noted, data are given for materials in their standard state (at 25 °C [77 °F], 100 kPa). Infobox references

Hydromelonic acid, is an elusive chemical compound with formula C_{9}H_{3}N_{13} or (HNCN)_{3}(C_{6}N_{7}), whose molecule would consist of a heptazine H3(C_{6}N_{7}) molecule, with three cyanamido groups H–N=C=N– or N≡C–NH– substituted for the hydrogen atoms.

The compound had not been properly isolated as of 2010, due to its tendency to polymerize. However, removal of three protons yields the melonate (formerly hydromelonate) anion (NCN)_{3}(C_{6}N_{7})^{3−}, whose salts are stable and have been known since the 19th century. Removal of only two protons yields the divalent hydrogenmelonate anion H(NCN)_{3}(C_{6}N_{7})^{2−}.

== History ==
In 1834 Justus von Liebig described the compounds that he named melamine, melam, and melon. In 1835 Leopold Gmelin prepared a potassium salt (later identified as K_{3}[(NCN)_{3}(C_{6}N_{7})]) by heating potassium ferrocyanide with sulfur); recognizing their connection to the compounds described by Liebig, he named the salt "hydromelonate" and the corresponding acid "hydromelonic". In the following years Liebig prepared the same salt by other methods, such as by fusing potassium thiocyanate with antimony trichloride, and eventually determined the formula C_{9}N_{13}H_{3} for the acid.

The correct structure for the cation was published in 1937 by Linus Pauling and J. H. Sturdivant.

Starting in the 1970s, melonates have attracted new interest, motivated by research in cubic carbon nitride c-C_{3}N_{4}. Salts of many cations have been synthesized and studied, including mixed-cation salts and calcium hydrogenmelonate Ca[HC_{9}N_{13}]·7H_{2}O. The structure of potassium melonate pentahydrate K_{3}C_{9}N_{13}·5H_{2}O was elucidated only in 2005.

== Preparation ==
Sodium and potassium melonates are still routinely prepared by variations of one of Liebig's methods, namely by reacting melon with molten potassium thiocyanate, potassium cyanate, or sodium thiocyanate. Other salts can be prepared by double displacement reactions.

== Melonates ==
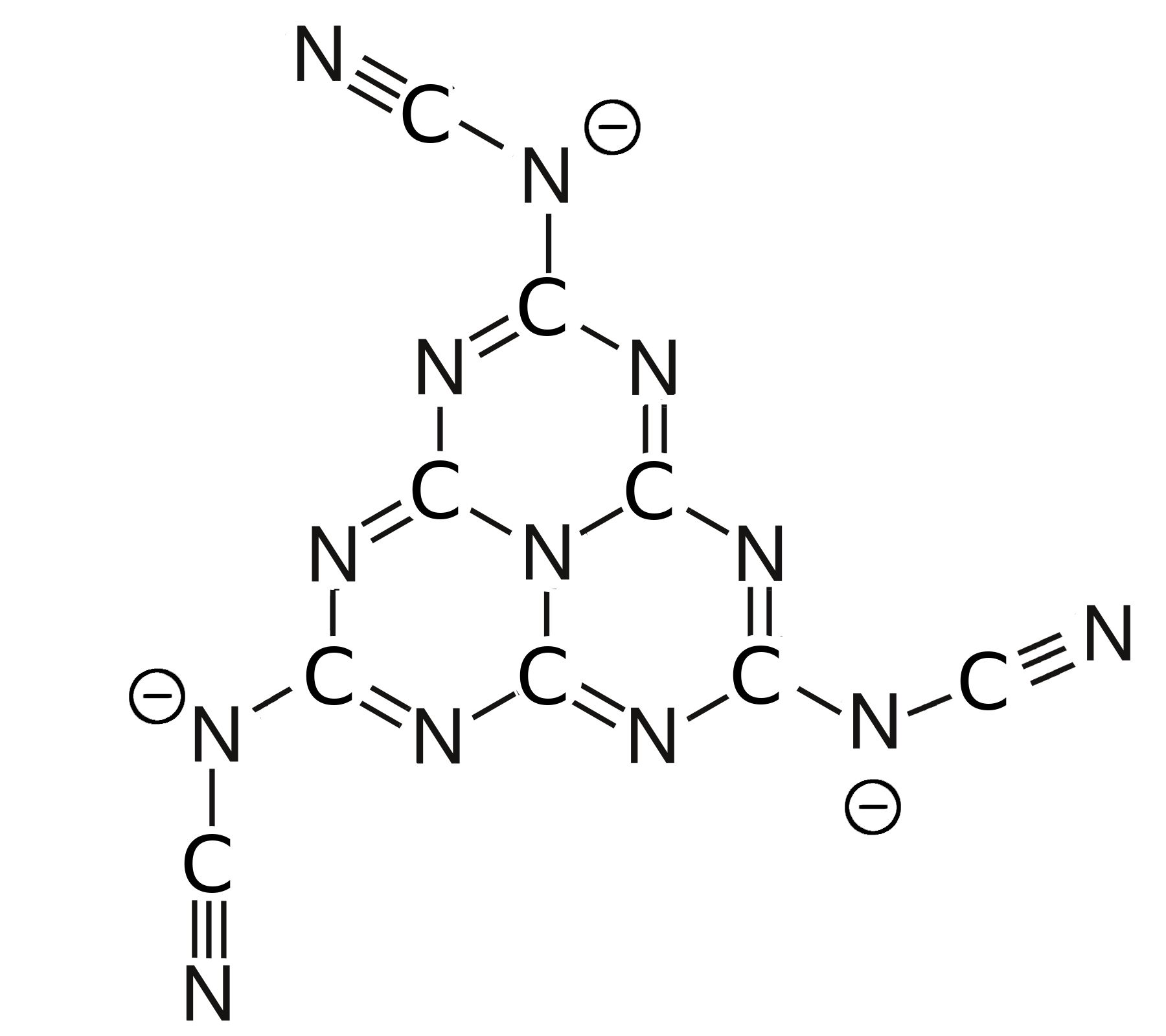
Melonate anion (NCN)_{3}(C_{6}N_{7})^{3−}.

Alkali melonates are soluble in water without decomposition. Treatment of melonates with alkali gives salts of cyameluric acid.

Potassium melonate pentahydrate has planar sheets of melonate anions with potassium cations between the layers. The same generals structure is seen in the anhydrous salt (except that the melonate ions are asymmetric due to an NHN– group being turned by 180°) and in the salts Rb_{3}C_{9}N_{13}·3H_{2}O and Cs_{3}C_{9}N_{13}·3H_{2}O.

Melonate salts decompose when melted with cyanates to form tricyanomelaminates, the first selective decomposition reaction leading from heptazines to triazines.

Pyrolysis of iron(III) melonate Fe[C_{9}N_{13}] at very high temperature yields carbon in the form of nanotubes.

== See also ==
- Melem, (H_{2}N)_{3}(C_{6}N_{7})
- Cyameluric acid, (HO)_{3}(C_{6}N_{7})
