= Cyameluric acid =

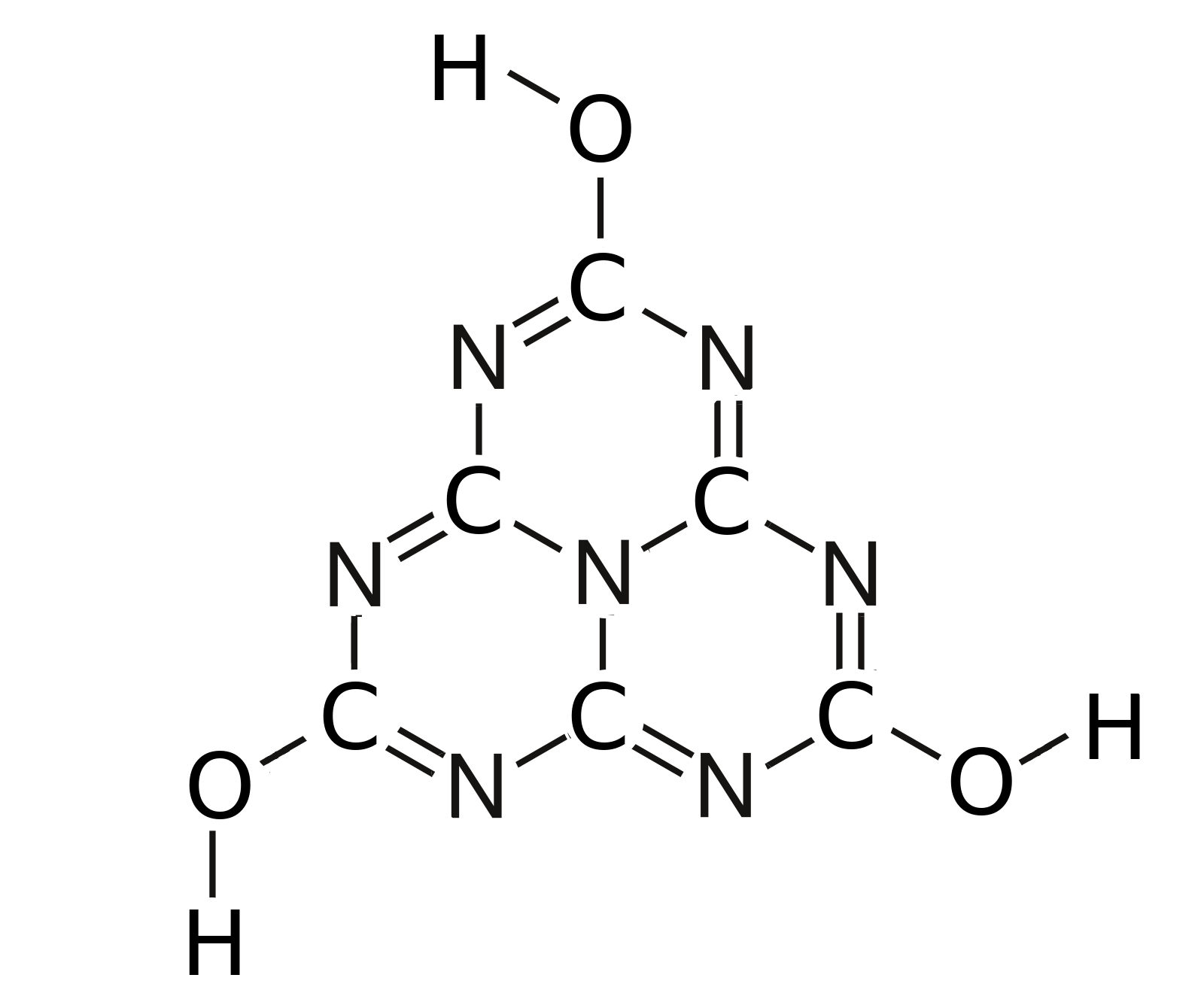
- Trihydroxy (imidic acid) tautomer

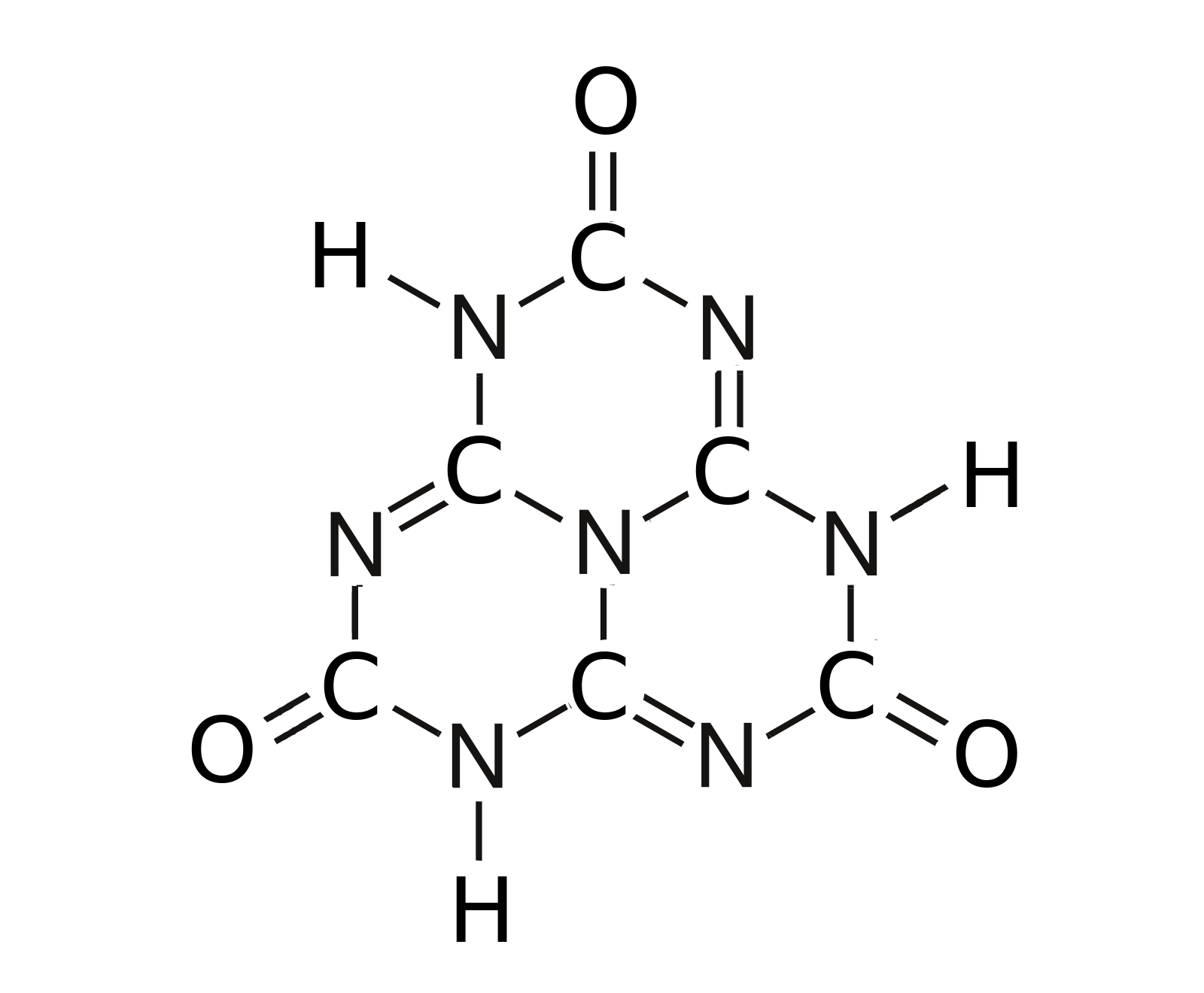
- Tricarbonyl (urea) tautomer

Names
- IUPAC name 2,4,6,8,10,12,13-heptazatricyclo[7.3.1.0^{5,13}]trideca-1,4,8-triene-3,7,11-trione
- Other names 1,3,4,6,7,9,9b-Heptaazaphenalene-2,5,8(1H,3H,6H)-trione; 2,5,8-trihydroxy-s-heptazine; 1,4,7-trihydro-2,5,8-trioxo-s-heptazine

Identifiers
CAS Number	1502-46-1
3D model (JSmol)	Interactive image
Beilstein Reference	34555, 542266
ChEBI	CHEBI:38050; CHEBI:38052; CHEBI:38054
ChemSpider	257010
PubChem CID	291317
UNII	FC54F41J58
CompTox Dashboard (EPA)	DTXSID80164492
- InChI: InChI=1S/C6H3N7O3/c14-4-7-1-8-5(15)10-3-12-6(16)11-2(9-4)13(1)3/h(H3,7,8,9,10,11,12,14,15,16) Key: PBKYCCOBOHDCIT-UHFFFAOYSA-N
- SMILES: C1(=O)NC2=NC(=O)NC3=NC(=O)N=C(N23)N1

Properties
Chemical formula	C_{6}H_{3}N_{7}O_{3}
Molar mass	221.13 g/mol
- Except where otherwise noted, data are given for materials in their standard state (at 25 °C [77 °F], 100 kPa). Infobox references

Cyameluric acid or 2,5,8-trihydroxy-s-heptazine is a chemical compound with formula C_{6}N_{7}O_{3}H_{3}, usually described as a heptazine molecule with the hydrogen atoms replaced by hydroxyl groups –OH; or any of its tautomers.

The substance exists as an equilibrium of 17 tautomers that easily interconvert among each other. Calculations show that the symmetric tri-oxo form (1,4,7-trihydro-2,5,8-trioxo-s-heptazine) is the most stable. Therefore, this compound contains urea groups rather than imidic acids.

== History ==
In 1834 Justus von Liebig described the compounds that he named melamine, melam, and melon. In 1835 Leopold Gmelin prepared novel salts by heating potassium ferrocyanide with sulfur); recognizing their connection to the compounds described by Liebig, he named the salts "hydromelonates" and the corresponding acid "hydromelonic". In the following years Liebig prepared the same salts by other methods, such as by fusing potassium thiocyanate with antimony trichloride, and eventually determined the formula C_{9}N_{13}H_{3} for the acid.

Cyameluric acid, H_{3}O_{3}C_{6}N_{7} and salts were prepared in 1850 by W. Henneberg, by treating Gmelin's "hydromelonate" with alkali.

The first person to suggest a structure for cyameluric acid was J. Loschmidt, as far back as 1861. His structure was in fact a meta-cyclophane, but it is remarkable since at that time cyclic compounds of any type were not widely recognised.

The correct structure (for the trihydroxy tautomer) was published in 1937 by Linus Pauling and J. H. Sturdivant.

== Structure and properties ==
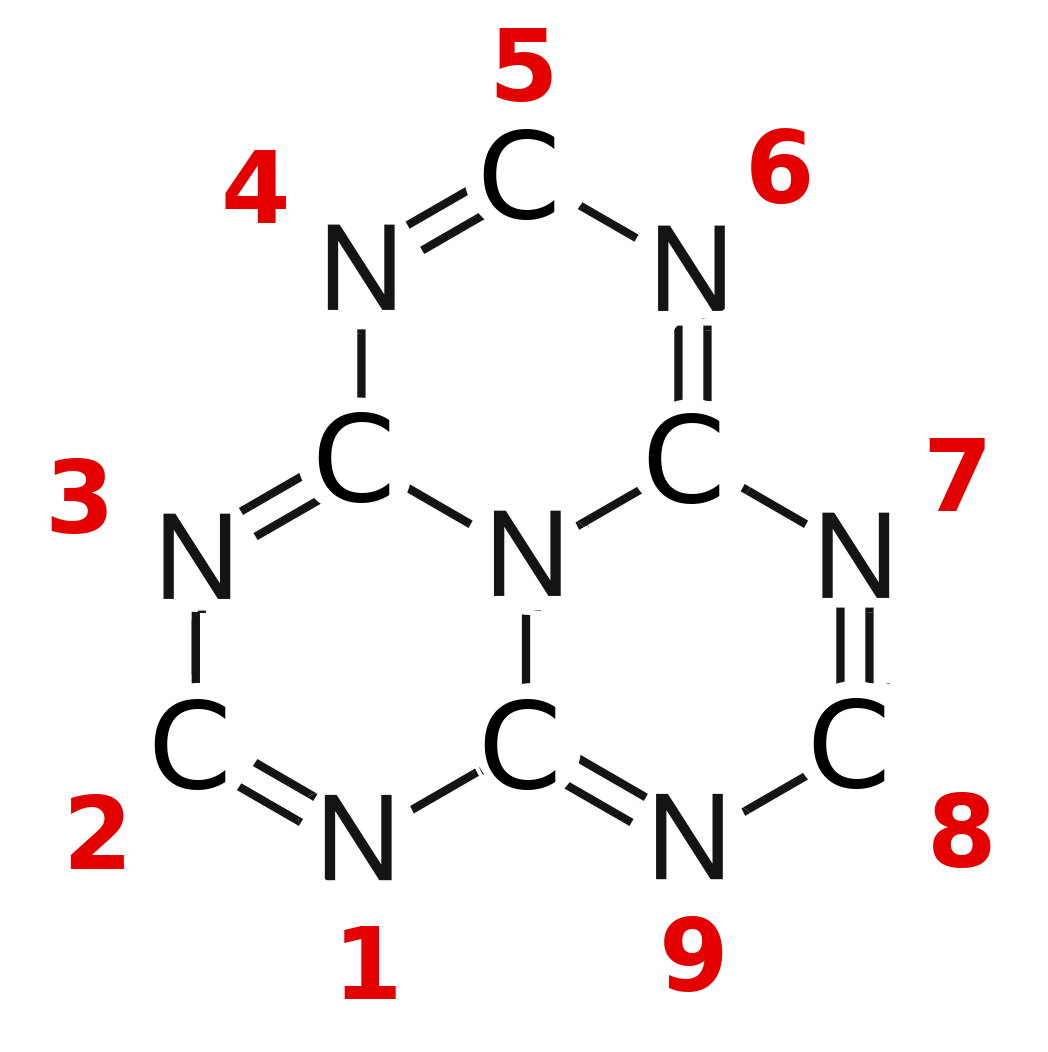
Numbering of the heptazine atoms

The various tautomeric forms differ in the position of the hydrogen atoms. Each oxygen is connected to one of the corner carbons; it may be bonded to a hydrogen, forming a hydroxy group; or may have a double bond to the carbon, in which case the hydrogen is bonded to one of several adjacent nitrogen atoms.

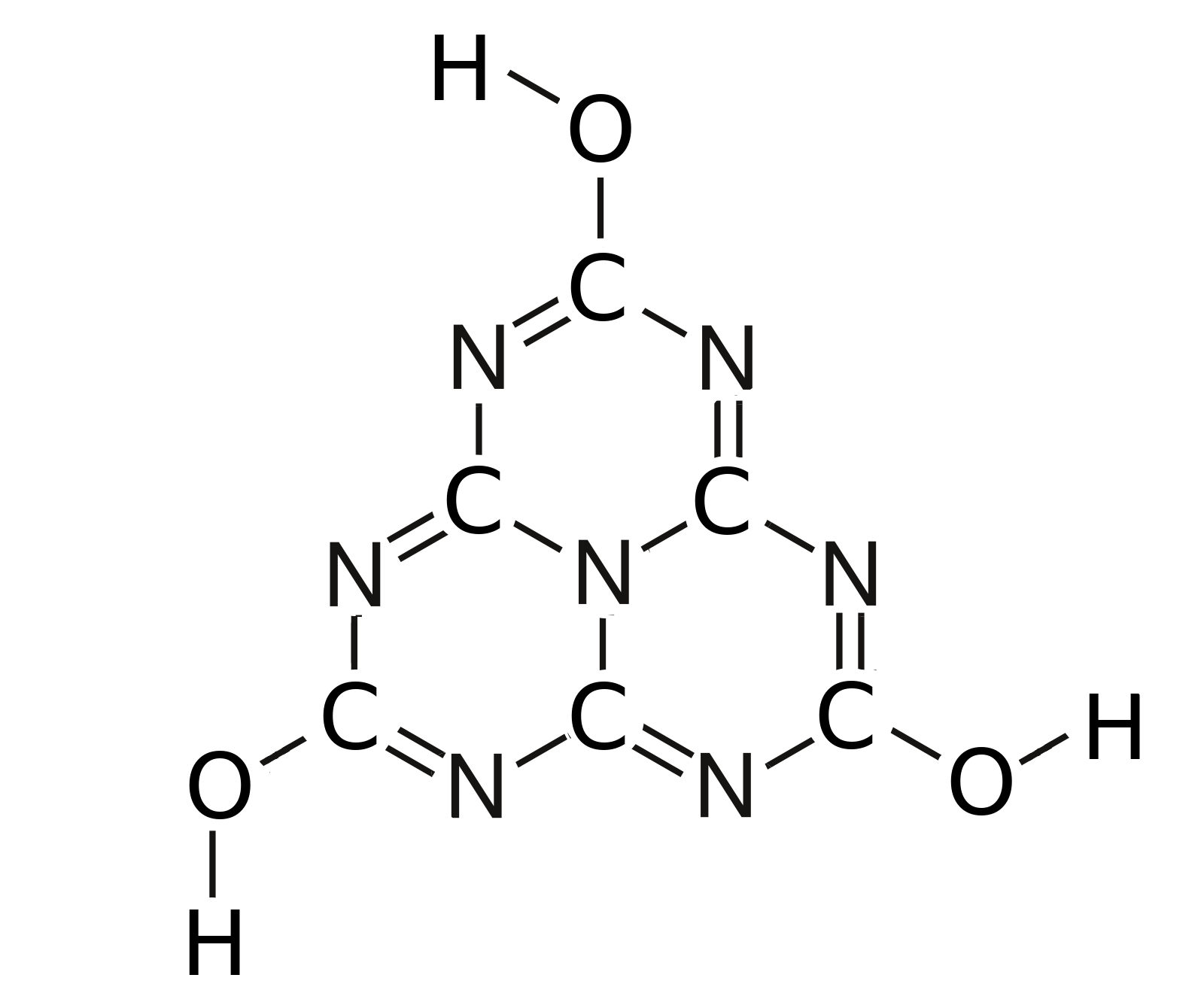
2,5,8-trihydroxy

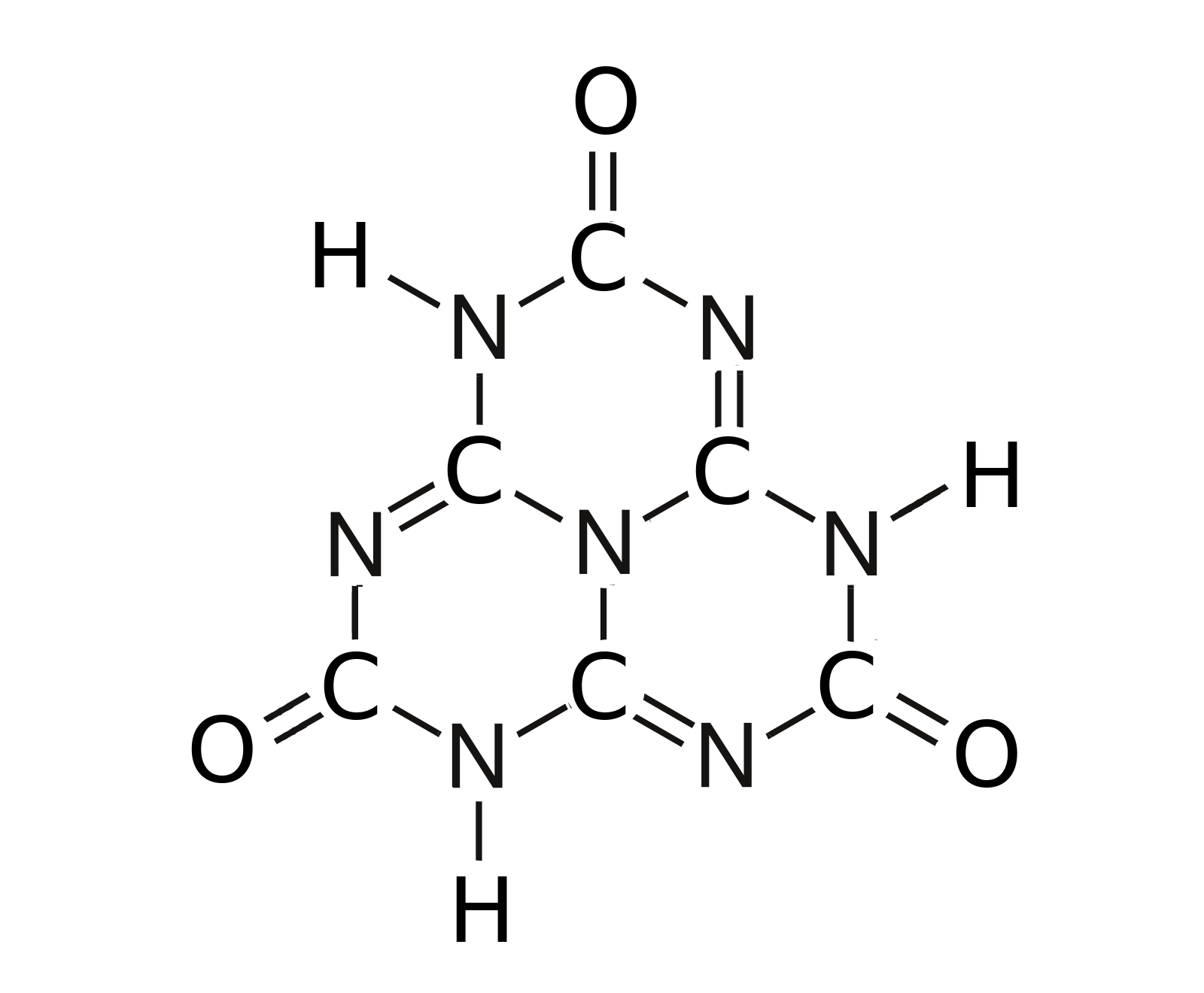
1,4,7-trihidro
2,5,8-trioxo

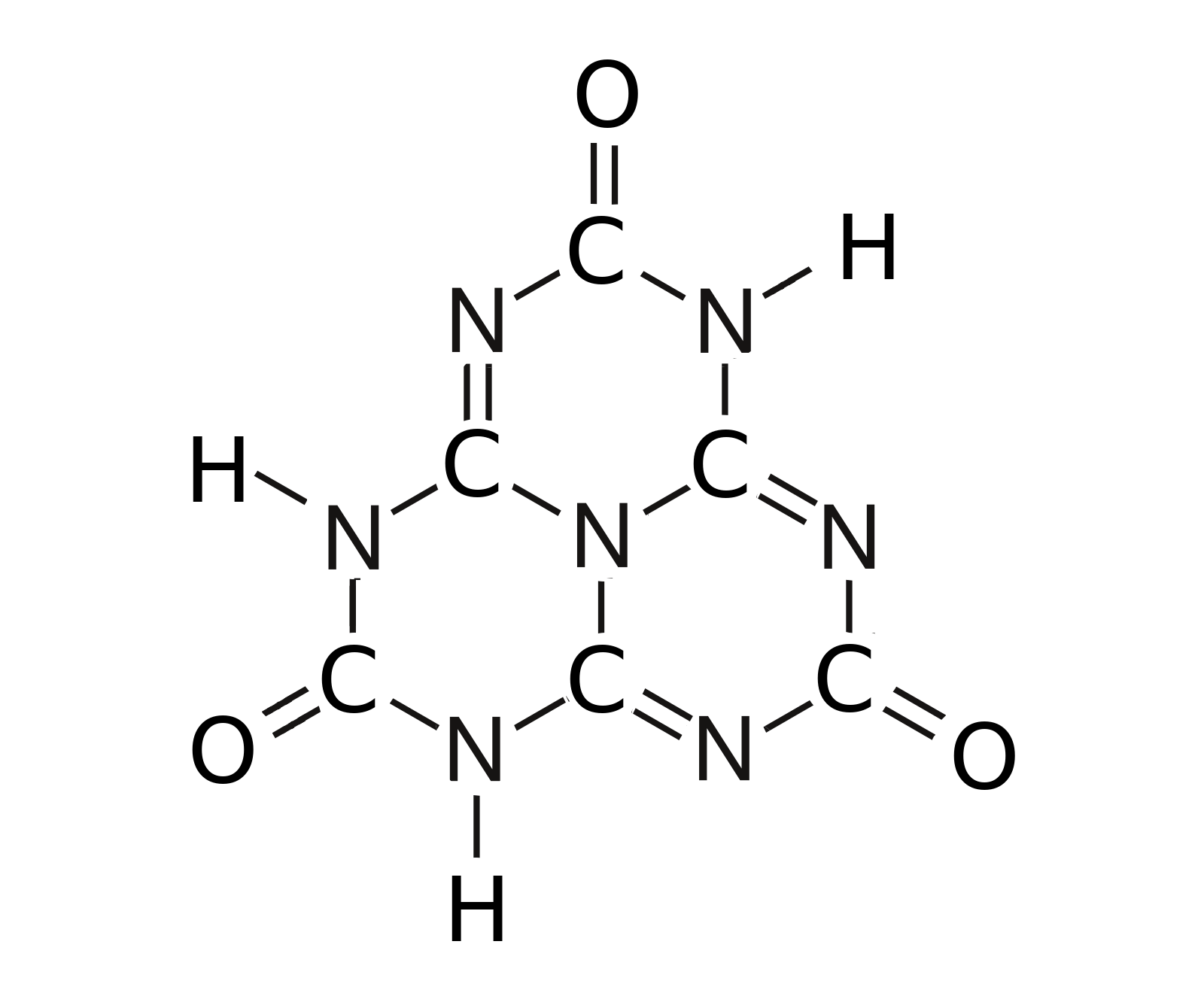
1,3,6-trihidro
2,5,8-trioxo

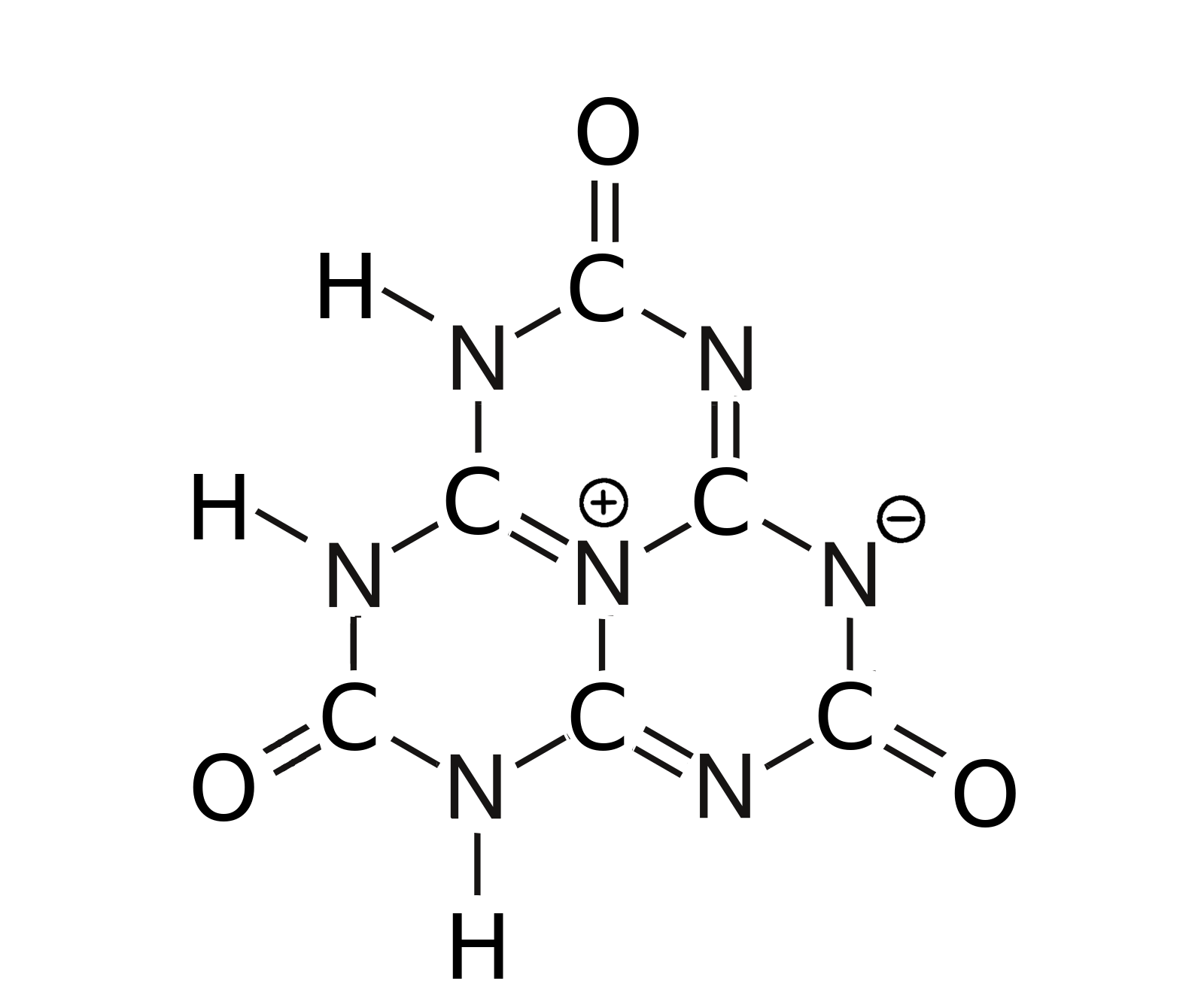
1,3,4-trihidro
2,5,8-trioxo

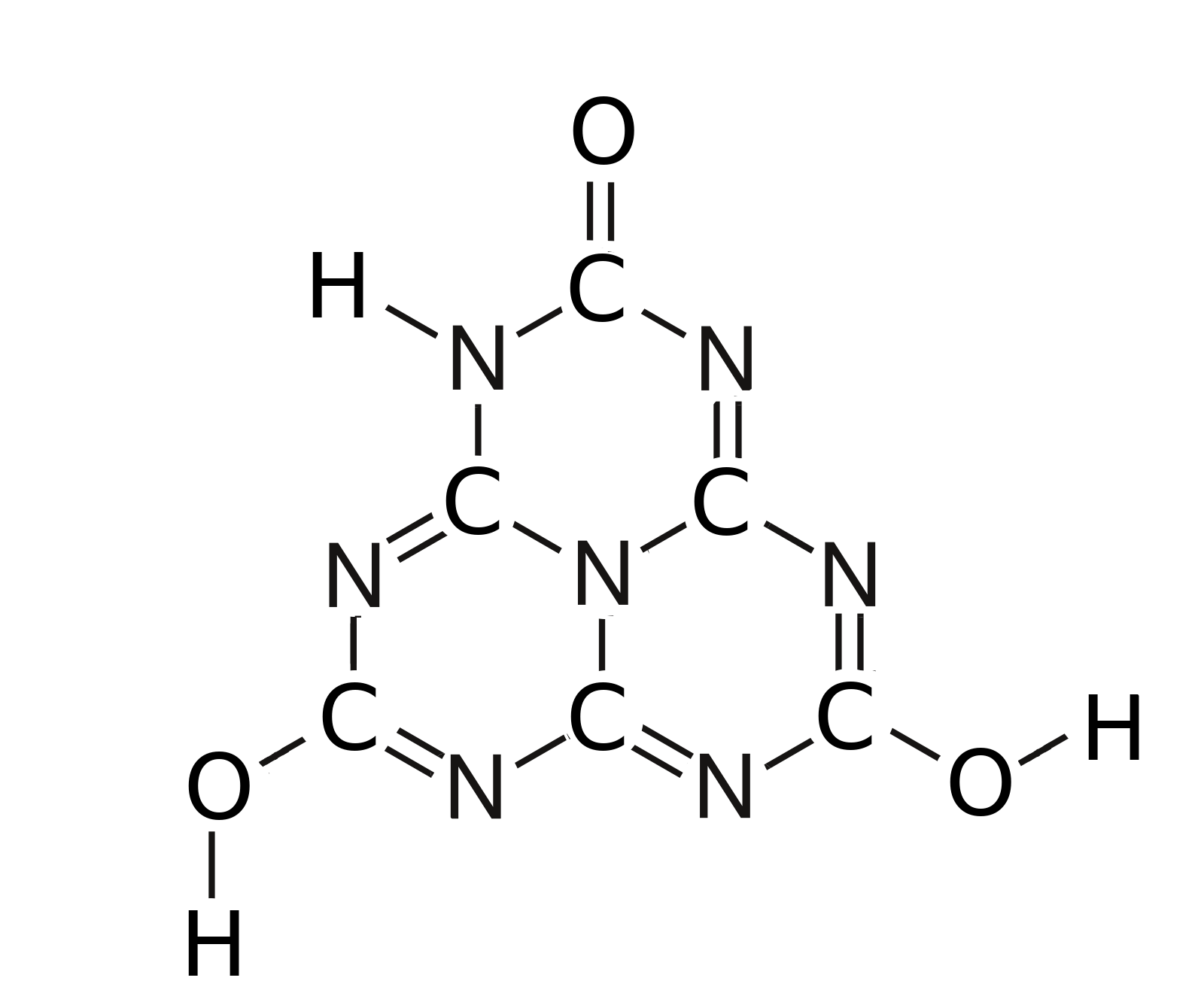
4-hidro
2,8-dihydroxy
5-oxo

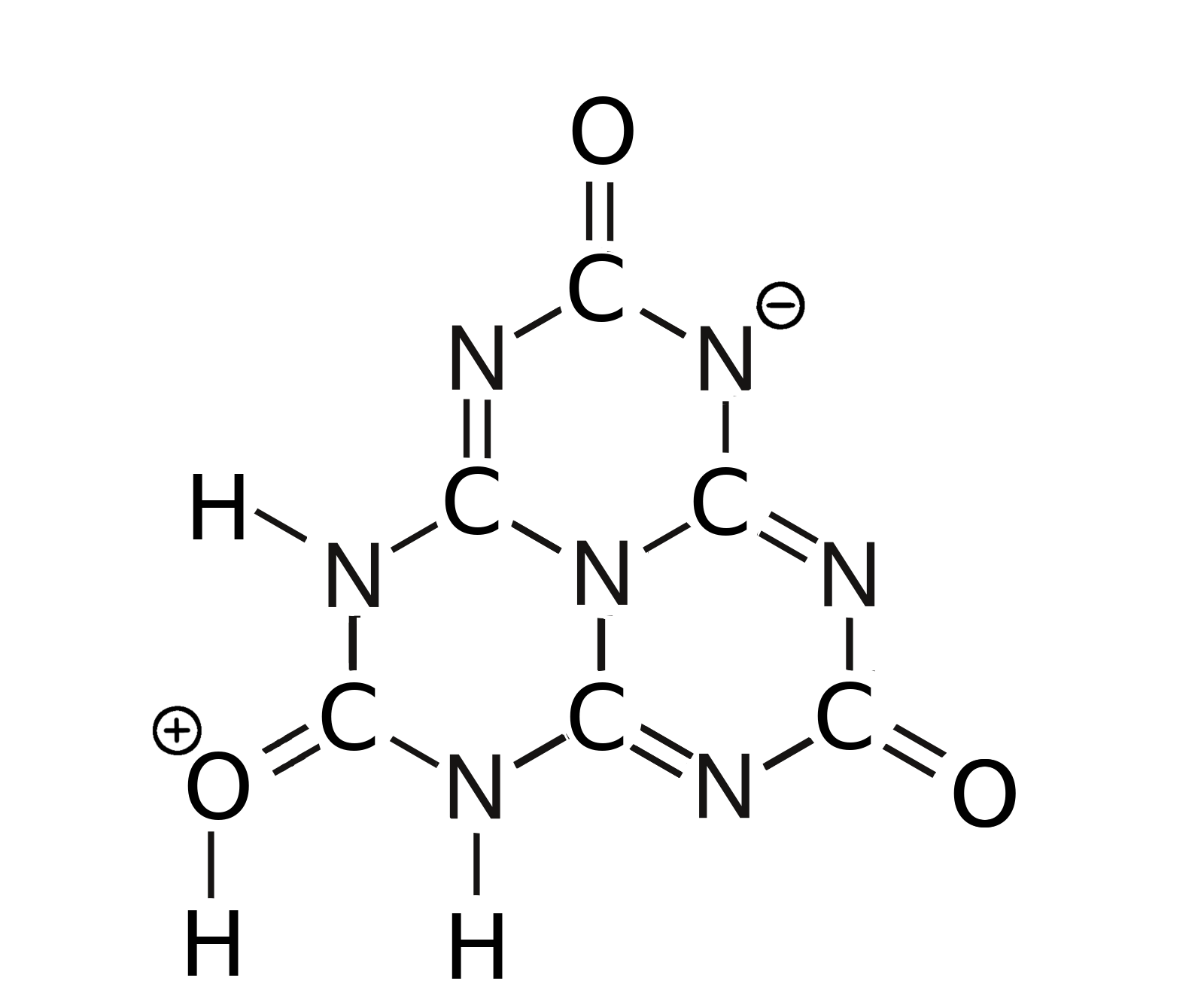
1,3-dihydro
2-hydroxy
5,8-dioxo

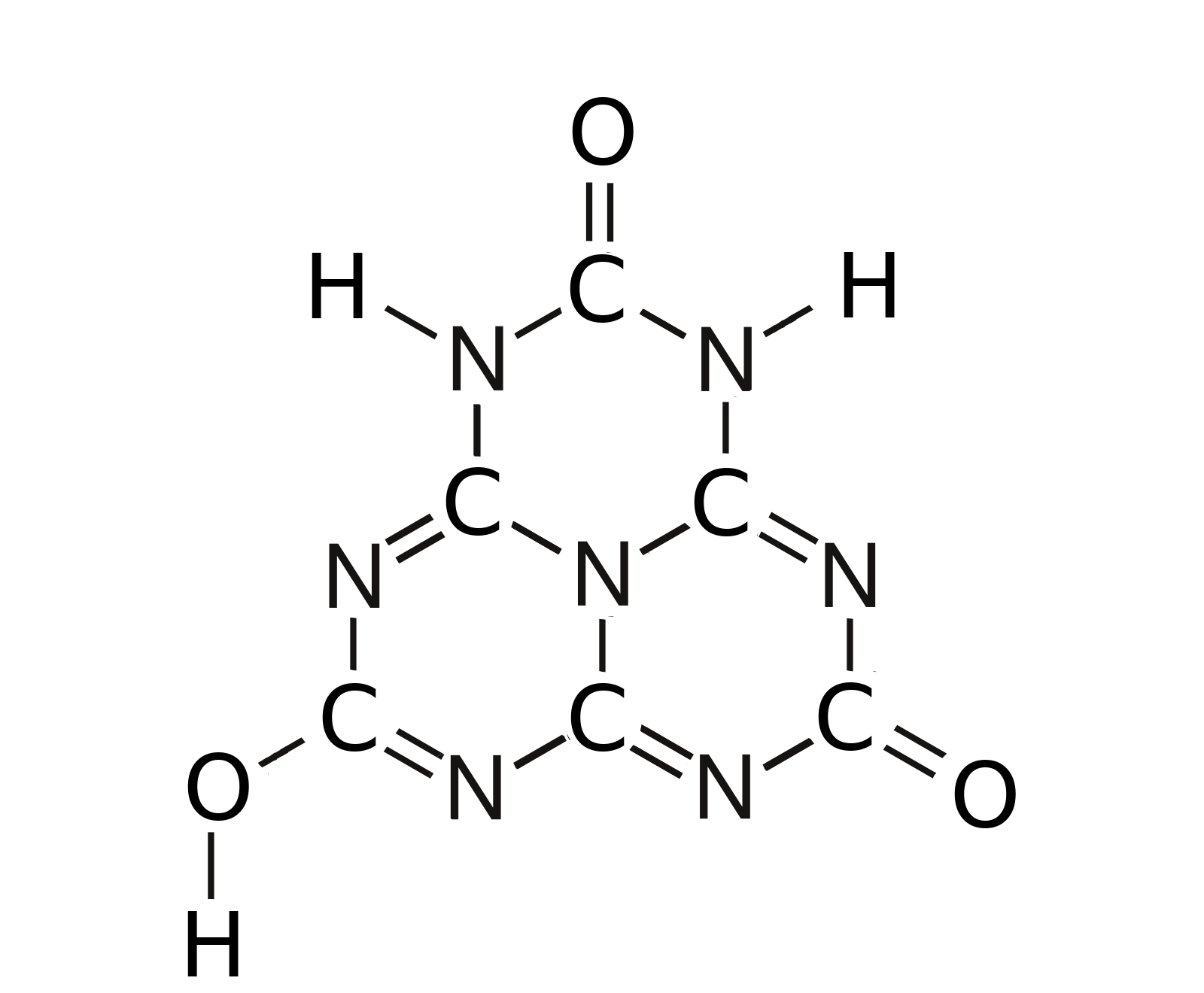
4,6-dihydro
2-hydroxy
5,8-dioxo

The trihydroxy tautomer is one of several that have more than one planar conformational isomer. In this case, there is a symmetric one, with all three hydroxyls bent in the same direction around the ring, and an asymmetric one, with one of them bent in the opposite direction compared to the other two. Calculations show that the symmetric form 1,4,7-trihydro-2,5,8-trioxo is the most stable. The energy of the asymmetric 1,3,7-trihydro-2,5,8-trioxo form is estimated to be 5.61 kcal/mol higher, and that of the two conformations of the trihydroxy form are 19.84 (symmetric) and 20.18 (asymmetric) kcal/mol higher.

== See also ==
- Melem, 2,5,8-triamino-heptazine.
