= Mercury(II) thiocyanate =

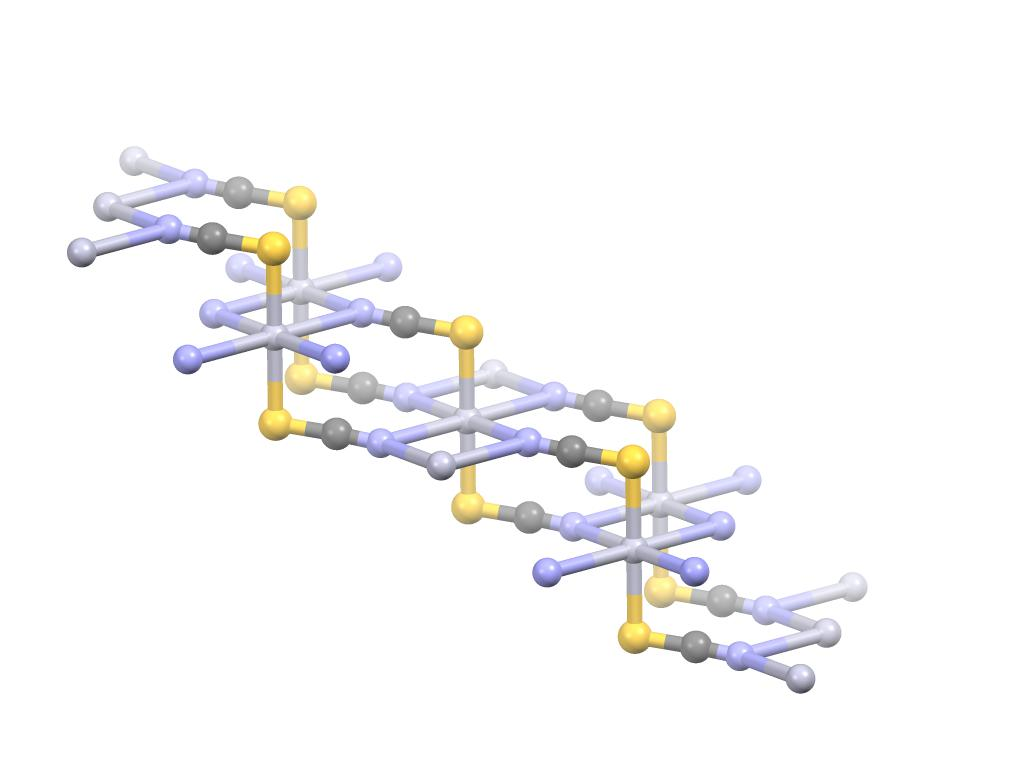
- Mercury(II) thiocyanate in crystal

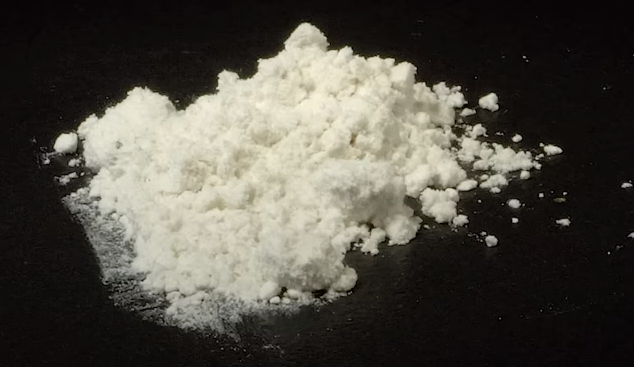

Names
- Other names: Mercuric thiocyanate; Mercuric sulfocyanate

Identifiers
CAS Number	592-85-8
3D model (JSmol)	Interactive image
ChemSpider	11126
ECHA InfoCard	100.008.886
EC Number	209-773-0
PubChem CID	11615
UNII	3JNH1DM7IF
UN number	1646
CompTox Dashboard (EPA)	DTXSID7060469
- InChI: InChI=1S/2CHNS.Hg/c2*2-1-3;/h2*3H;/q;;+2/p-2 Key: GBZANUMDJPCQHY-UHFFFAOYSA-L
- SMILES: C(#N)[S-].C(#N)[S-].[Hg+2]

Properties
Chemical formula	Hg(SCN)_{2}
Molar mass	316.75 g·mol^{−1}
Appearance	White monoclinic powder
Odor	odorless
Density	3.71 g/cm^{3}, solid
Melting point	165 °C (329 °F; 438 K) (decomposes)
Solubility in water	0.069 g/100 mL
Solubility	Soluble in dilute hydrochloric acid, ammonia; slightly soluble in alcohol, ether
Magnetic susceptibility (χ)	−96.5×10^{−6} cm^{3}/mol

Structure
Crystal structure	Monoclinic
Space group	C2/m
Lattice constant	a = 10.878 Å, b = 4.042 Å, c = 6.435 Å α = 90°, β = 95.28°, γ = 90°
Lattice volume (V)	281.7 Å
Formula units (Z)	2

Hazards
- GHS labelling
Pictograms	(GHS06: Toxic) (GHS08: Health hazard) (GHS09: Environmental hazard)
Signal word	Danger
Hazard statements	H300, H310, H330, H373, H410
Precautionary statements	P260, P262, P264, P270, P271, P273, P280, P284, P301+P316, P302+P352, P304+P340, P316, P319, P320, P321, P330, P361+P364, P391, P403+P233, P405, P501
NFPA 704 (fire diamond)	4 0 1
Flash point	120 °C (248 °F; 393 K)
Threshold limit value (TLV)	0.025 mg/m^{3} (skin) (TWA)
- Lethal dose or concentration (LD, LC)
LD_{50} (median dose)	46 mg/kg (rat, oral)
- NIOSH (US health exposure limits)
PEL (Permissible)	5 mg/m^{3} (TWA); 0.1 mg/m^{3} (ceiling)
REL (Recommended)	0.05 mg/m^{3} (TWA); 0.1 mg/m^{3} (ceiling)
IDLH (Immediate danger)	10 mg/m^{3}
- Except where otherwise noted, data are given for materials in their standard state (at 25 °C [77 °F], 100 kPa). verify (what is ?) Infobox references

Mercury(II) thiocyanate (Hg(SCN)_{2}) is an inorganic chemical compound, the coordination complex of Hg^{2+} and the thiocyanate anion. It is a white powder. It will produce a large, winding "snake" when ignited, an effect known as the Pharaoh's serpent.

== Synthesis and structure ==
The first synthesis of mercury thiocyanate was probably completed in 1821 by Jöns Jacob Berzelius:

HgO + 2 HSCN → Hg(SCN)_{2} + H_{2}O

Evidence for the first pure sample was presented in 1866 prepared by a chemist named Otto Hermes. It is prepared by treating solutions containing mercury(II) ions with a thiocyanate ion source. The low solubility product of mercury thiocyanate causes it to precipitate from the solution.:

Hg(NO_{3})_{2} + 2 KSCN → Hg(SCN)_{2} + 2 KNO_{3}

The compound adopts a polymeric structure with Hg^{2+} centres linearly coordinated to two S atoms with a distance of 2.381 Å. Four weak Hg^{2+}-N interactions are indicated with distances of 2.81 Å.

== Reactions ==
Mercury thiocyanate has a few uses in chemical synthesis.

It is the precursor to other thiocyanate complexes such as potassium tris(thiocyanato)mercurate(II) (K[Hg(SCN)_{3}]) and caesium tris(thiocyanato)mercurate(II) (Cs[Hg(SCN)_{3}]). The Hg(SCN)^{3−} ion can also exist independently and is easily generated from the compounds above, amongst others.

Organic halides attack Hg(SCN)_{2} to give a mercuric halide and a mixture of the corresponding thiocyanate and isothiocyanate.

Mercuric thiocyanate catalyzes HSCN or BrSCN addition (either reagent formed in situ) to alkynes.

== Use in chloride analysis ==
Mercury thiocyanate improves detection limits of chloride ions in water by UV-visible spectroscopy. The method involves the addition of mercury thiocyanate to a solution with an unknown concentration of chloride ions and iron as a reagent. The chloride ions cause the mercury thiocyanate salt to dissociate and the thiocyanate ion to bind Fe(III), which absorbs intensely at 450 nm. This absorption allows for the measurement of the concentration of the iron complex. This value allows one to calculate the concentration of chloride. This technique was a standard method for the determination of chloride ions in laboratories worldwide.

== Pharaoh's serpent ==
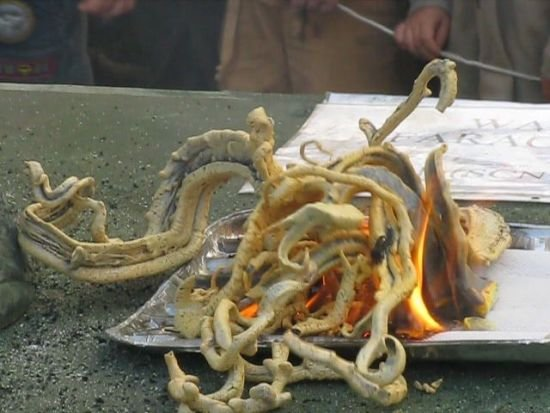
Pharaoh's serpent demonstration

Mercury thiocyanate was formerly used in pyrotechnics causing an effect known as the Pharaoh's serpent or Pharaoh's snake. The fireworks versions were a mixture with a small amount of potassium nitrate and gum arabic as a binder. This use ceased in most countries in the early 20th century due to the toxicity of mercury, and the existence of a superior alternatives.

=== Chemistry of the reaction ===
When heated, mercury(II) thiocyanate decomposes in an exothermic reaction that produces a large mass of coiling, serpent-like solids. The resulting solid can range from dark graphite gray to light tan in colour with the inside generally much darker than the outside. This was found to be due to decomposition of the produced β-HgS (black mercury sulfide) and vaporization of the resulting mercury from the outermost and hottest layers of the solid.

The decomposition of Hg(SCN)_{2} is exothermic on its own, and the CS_{2} produced ignites easily and burns off. The C_{3}N_{4} product is a simplification; the actual product contains 0.5% hydrogen and is likely to consist of sheets of triazine rings linked by −N= and −NH− groups similar to g−C_{3}N_{4} and was found to contain nano-particles of β-HgS (black mercury sulfide).

The number of resonance structures of heptazine and triazine, varying molecular weights of samples, and the fluorescense of the product made acquiring spectra difficult even by relatively exotic methods of NMR (with one spectrum acquisition being run for 12 days straight to get a mostly clean reading). Because of this, a heptazine-based structure similar to Liebig's melon, a compound initially prepared around the same time that the pharoah's snake reaction was discovered, was not ruled out by the authors as a partial component of the solid material. The generalized reaction is as follows:

- 2 Hg(SCN)_{2} → 2 β−HgS + CS_{2} + C_{3}N_{4}
- β−HgS + O_{2} → Hg + SO_{2} (not all mercury sulfide decomposes)
