= Sturdivant =

Sturdivant can refer to:

- Sturdivant (surname)
- Sturdivant, Missouri
- The Sturdivant Gang, a group of counterfeiters
