= Uley graphite project =

- Location within South Australia
- Location: Eyre Peninsula, South Australia, Australia; 34.797°S 135.70°E
- Products: graphite
- Opened: 2014
- Active: 1920s to 1993 and from 2014
- Company: Valence Industries later known as Quantum Graphite Operations Pty Ltd
- Website: www.valenceindustries.com/activities.php

The Uley graphite project is a graphite mine at Uley 23 km southwest of Port Lincoln on the Eyre Peninsula in South Australia. It is also known as the Ouray mine. The mine is under "care and maintenance".

== Project overview and history ==
Graphite was discovered in the area of the Uley project in the early 1800s and it was mined intermittently from the 1920s until 1993, when it was placed on care and maintenance. When in production, the open cut mine was capable of producing up to 14,000 tonnes of graphite concentrate annually.

The project was re-activated in 2014 by Valence Industries Ltd. Valence Industries was an ASX listed company (ASX: VXL) focused on graphite development and production. The Uley project was its core asset and main focus. Valence reported first sales of graphite from the Uley mine under its ownership in 2014 and had all approvals in place to commence production at the mine, plus a high grade Ore Reserve. It had also completed a Feasibility Study for the significant expansion of its Uley graphite operations. Valence Industries changed its name to Quantum Graphite Limited (ASX: QGL) on 14 July 2017.

The Uley Graphite Project is acknowledged as one of the largest coarse flake graphite deposits in the world. The deposit contains near-surface, disseminated, high-grade flake graphite. The project is held on freehold land, and comprises two Mining Licences and two associated Retention Licences, plus a large Exploration Licence south of the existing Uley graphite facilities.

== Location ==
The Uley project is located in a region composed predominantly of freehold and perpetual leasehold land used in the main for cereal cropping and livestock grazing. An established network of haul roads and sealed highways connect the project to available port facilities, and national road and rail networks. A two lane highway connects Port Lincoln to other regional towns on the Eyre Peninsula and Adelaide, the South Australian capital.

Port Lincoln is the major regional centre in the Lower Eyre Peninsula and has a population of about 14,000, and has extensive public facilities, an airport serviced by regular flights to Adelaide, and a modern deep-water port, capable of handling up to Panamax-size ships.

== Existing plant and infrastructure ==
The Uley Graphite Mine has significant existing plant and infrastructure which could facilitate ongoing operations. This includes lined tailings dams, site access and haul roads linking a sealed road to Port Lincoln and associated port infrastructure, plus power and water infrastructure requirements of the project. The project area is connected to the National Electricity grid. There are also existing workshops plus laboratory and administration buildings on site.

== Reserves and resources ==
The Uley project hosts a significant Ore Reserve and Mineral Resource defined from drilling at Uley Pit 2.

The Ore Reserve is; 4.003Mt @ 11.9% graphitic Carbon (gC) for 476,000 contained tonnes (at a 3.5% gC cut-off grade).

The total Inferred, Indicated and Measured Mineral Resource is; 6.3 Mt @ 11.1% graphitic Carbon (gC) for 697,000 contained tonnes (at a 3.5% gC cut-off grade).

The Ore Reserve estimate is based on Measured and Indicated Mineral Resources only. The Ore Reserve and Mineral Resource were calculated in accordance with JORC 2012 guidelines. In addition the project contains JORC 2012 Exploration Targets of between 6Mt and 12Mt @ 9% to 12% graphitic Carbon, providing the potential for significant Resource and Reserve expansion.

The citation for this is the announcement to the ASX lodged on 27 November 2019 and 11 December 2019.
