= Boron carbides =

Boron carbides are boron–carbon compounds.

== B_{13}C_{2} ==
Boron carbide with the composition B_{13}C_{2} has a structure comprising B_{12} icosahedral clusters and linear C–B–C chains. In 2016, researchers reported the synthesis of fully ordered, stoichiometric B_{13}C_{2} single crystals using high-pressure, high-temperature techniques. Their analysis of synchrotron X-ray diffraction data showed that structural disorder and defects are not essential features of this composition.

== α-tetragonal boron ==
α-tetragonal boron is a boron-rich isotropic boron carbide (B_{50}C_{2}).

== Borafullerenes ==
Borafullerenes are a class of heterofullerenes in which the element substituting for carbon is boron.

== See also ==
- Crystal structure of boron-rich metal borides
