= Carbon nitride =

Chemical compound made of only carbon and nitrogen

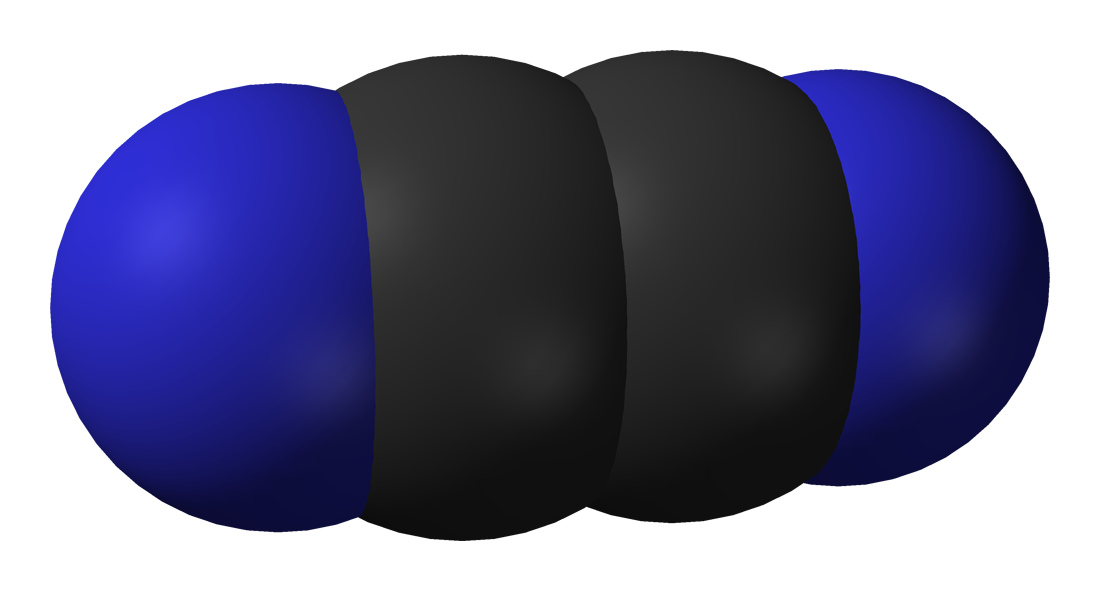
Cyanogen is a carbon nitride.

Carbon nitrides are organic compounds consisting only of carbon and nitrogen atoms.

== Covalent network compounds ==
These materials are organic semiconductors. Due to its hydrogen-bonding motifs and electron-rich properties, this carbon material is considered a potential candidate for material applications in carbon supplementation.

- Beta carbon nitride – a solid with a formula β-C_{3}N_{4}, which is predicted to be harder than diamond.
- Graphitic carbon nitride – g-C_{3}N_{4}, with important catalytic and sensor properties.
- C_{3}N_{5} – a combined triazole and triazine framework.
- MCN-12 (C_{3}N_{6}) and MCN-13 (C_{3}N_{7}).

== Azafullerenes ==
- Azafullerenes are a class of heterofullerenes in which the element substituting for carbon is nitrogen. Examples include (C_{59}N)_{2} (biazafullerenyl), C_{58}N_{2} (diaza[60]fullerene), C_{57}N_{3} (triaza[60]fullerene) and C_{48}N_{12}.

== Cyanofullerenes ==
- Cyanofullerenes are a class of modified fullerenes in which cyano- groups are attached to a fullerene skeleton. These have the formula C_{60}(CN)_{2n}, where n takes the values 1 to 9.

== Cyanogen ==
- Cyanogen – C_{2}N_{2} (N≡C−C≡N)
- Isocyanogen – C_{2}N_{2} (^{−}C≡N^{+}−C≡N)
- Diisocyanogen – C_{2}N_{2} (^{−}C≡N^{+}−^{+}N≡C^{−})
- Paracyanogen – a cyanogen polymer, (NCCN)_{n}
- Paraisocyanogen – a cyanogen polymer, (CNCN)_{n}

== Percyanoalkynes, -alkenes and -alkanes ==
- dicyanoacetylene – C_{4}N_{2} or N≡C−C≡C−C≡N, also called carbon subnitride or but-2-ynedinitrile
- tetracyanoethylene – C_{6}N_{4} or (N≡C−)_{2}C=C(−C≡N)_{2}
- tetracyanomethane – C_{5}N_{4} or C(−C≡N)_{4}
- 2,2-diisocyanopropanedinitrile – C_{5}N_{4} or (^{−}C≡N^{+}−)_{2}C(−C≡N)_{2} also called dicyano(diisocyano)methane
- hexacyanoethane – C_{8}N_{6} or (N≡C−)_{3}C−C(−C≡N)_{3}
- hexacyanocyclopropane – C_{9}N_{6} or cyclo-C_{3}(CN)_{6}
- hexacyanobutadiene – C_{10}N_{6} or (N≡C−)_{2}C=C(−C≡N)−C(−C≡N)=C(−C≡N)_{2}

=== Dicyanopolyynes ===
Dicyanopolyynes are compounds with the chemical formula N≡C(−C≡C−)_{n}C≡N (n = 2–10). They are composed of a chain of carbon atoms with alternating single and triple bonds, terminated by nitrogen atoms. Although not polyynes, cyanogen N≡C−C≡N (n = 0) and dicyanoacetylene N≡C−C≡C−C≡N (n = 1) also fit within this series.

== Perazidoalkynes, -alkenes and -alkanes ==
- tetraazidomethane – CN_{12} or C(−N=N^{+}=N^{−})_{4}

== Percyanoheterocycles ==
- pentacyanopyridine – C_{10}N_{6}
- tetracyanopyrazine – C_{8}N_{6}
- tricyanotriazine – C_{6}N_{6}
- tetracyano-bitriazine – C_{10}N_{10}
- dicyanotetrazine – C_{4}N_{6}
- hexacyanotrisimidazole – C_{15}N_{12}
- hexacyanohexaazatriphenylene – C_{18}N_{12}

== Aromatic cyanocarbons ==
- hexacyanobenzene – C_{12}N_{6} or C_{6}(CN)_{6}
- octacyanonaphthalene – C_{18}N_{8} or C_{10}(CN)_{8}
- decacyanoanthracene – C_{24}N_{10} or C_{14}(CN)_{10}

== Other compounds ==
- cyanonitrene – CN_{2} or [N≡C−N ⇌ ^{−}N=C=N^{+} ⇌ ^{+}N=C=N^{−} ⇌ N−C≡N] (one of the nitrogens is univalent)
- azodicarbonitrile – C_{2}N_{4} or N≡C−N=N−C≡N, cis and trans isomers
- cyanogen azide – CN_{4} or N≡C−N=N^{+}=N^{−}
- 1-diazidocarbamoyl-5-azidotetrazole – C_{2}N_{14}
- 2,2′-azobis(5-azidotetrazole) – C_{2}N_{16}
- dicyanocarbene – C_{3}N_{2} or C^{II}(−C≡N)_{2} (and isomers cyanoisocyanocarbene ^{−}C≡N^{+}−C^{II}−C≡N, diisocyanocarbene ^{−}C≡N^{+}−C^{II}−^{+}N≡C^{−}, 3-cyano-2H-azirenylidene and 3-isocyano-2H-azirenylidene)
- dicyanodiazomethane – C_{3}N_{4} or (N≡C−)_{2}C=N^{+}=N^{−}, the only C_{3}N_{4} isomer prepared in bulk
- tricyanamide (nitrogen tricyanide) – C_{3}N_{4} or N(−C≡N)_{3}, has never been prepared yet
- dicyanocarbodiimide (carbon bis(cyanamide)) – C_{3}N_{4} or N≡C−N=C=N−C≡N, detected in photolysis products of triazido-s-triazine
- cyanuric triazide (triazido-s-triazine) – C_{3}N_{12} or C_{3}N_{3}(N_{3})_{3}
- dicyanomethylenecyanamide (tricyanomethanimine) – C_{4}N_{4} or N≡C−N=C(−C≡N)_{2}
- diazidodicyanoethylene – C_{4}N_{8} or (^{−}N=N^{+}=N−)_{2}C=C(−C≡N)_{2} and (^{−}N=N^{+}=N−)(N≡C−)C=C(−N=N^{+}=N^{−})(−C≡N), cis and trans
- 2,5,8-triazido-s-heptazine – C_{6}N_{16} (C_{6}N_{7}(N_{3})_{3})
- 1,3,5-triazido-2,4,6-tricyanobenzene – C_{9}N_{12} or C_{6}(CN)_{3}(N_{3})_{3}

== Anions and functional groups ==
- cyanide – ^{−}C≡N ion, cyanide −C≡N and isocyanide −^{+}N≡C^{−} functional groups
- dicyanamide (dca^{−}) – N(CN)^{−}_{2} or ^{−}N(−C≡N)_{2}. It forms coordination polymers with metal ions, where it acts as a bridging ligand.
- tricyanomethanide (tcm^{−}) – C(CN)^{−}_{3} or ^{−}C(−C≡N)_{3}. It acts as a bridging ligand in coordination polymers. Its conjugate acid is cyanoform.
- pentacyanoethanide – C_{2}(CN)^{−}_{5} or (N≡C−)_{2}C^{−}−C(−C≡N)_{3}
- pentacyanopropenide (pentacyanoallyl anion) – C_{3}(CN)^{−}_{5} or (N≡C)−C(C(CN)_{2})^{−}_{2}
- pentacyanocyclopentadienide – C_{10}N^{−}_{5} or C_{5}(CN)^{−}_{5}
- 2-dicyanomethylene-1,1,3,3-tetracyanopropanediide (tcpd^{2−}) – C_{10}N^{2−}_{6} or C(C(CN)_{2})^{2−}_{3}. The anion is approximately D_{3} symmetric; each C(CN)_{2} group is coplanar with the central carbon atom but tilted with respect to the other groups, in order to relieve steric repulsion between adjacent groups. It acts as a tetradentate bridging ligand in the three-dimensional coordination polymer Cu(tn)(tcpd).
- azidotetrazolate – CN^{−}_{7} or N_{3}−CN_{4}^{−}. It forms salts that are extremely sensitive primary explosives.
- 5-cyanotetrazolate (ctz^{−}) – C_{2}N^{−}_{5} or N≡C−CN^{−}_{4}. It acts as a bridging ligand in coordination polymers.
- tricyanomelaminate – C_{6}N^{3−}_{9} or C_{3}N_{3}(NCN)^{3−}_{3}
- melonate – C_{9}N^{3−}_{13} or C_{6}N_{7}(NCN)^{3−}_{3}
- cyanofullerene anions – C_{60}(CN)^{–}_{n} (n odd) and C_{60}(CN)^{2–}_{n} (n even). C_{60}(CN)^{−}_{5} is particularly stable. The radical anion C_{60}(CN)^{•–}_{2} has also been prepared, though it is prone to dimerization to [C_{60}(CN)_{2}]^{2−}_{2}.
- cyanoacetylide – C_{3}N^{−} or ^{−}C≡C−C≡N. Its conjugate acid is cyanoacetylene.
- cyanopolyynide anions – C_{2n+3}N^{−} or ^{−}C≡C−(C≡C−)_{n}C≡N (n ≥ 1). Their conjugate acids are the cyanopolyynes.

== See also ==
- Oxocarbon
