= James Holmes Sturdivant =

American chemist

James Holmes Sturdivant (1906–1972) was a chemist who worked for several years as the main research assistant to Linus Pauling at Caltech, starting in 1927. He co-authored some seminal papers with Pauling, and was co-advisor of Robert Eugene Rundle.

== Personal history ==
James Sturdivant was born in Greenville, Texas, on June 22, 1906. He got is B. A. degree at the University of Texas in 1926, his M. A. in 1927, and his Ph. D. at Caltech in 1930, advised by Pauling. By December 1954 he was living at the Athenaeum, 551 South Hill Avenue, Pasadena.

Sturdivant died in Pasadena on April 21, 1972, at the age of 66, survived by his wife Arletta.

== Work ==
He was instructor in Mathematics at the University of Texas from 1926 to 1927. At Caltech, he held the position of Teaching Fellow (1927-1930), Research Fellow (1930-1935), Senior Fellow in Research (1935-1938), and Assistant Professor (since 1938). As a professor, he taught X-ray crystallography.

One of the first results of the collaboration with Pauling, soon after is hiring in 1927, was the elucidation of the structure of the titanium mineral brookite, that led Pauling to develop his theory of coordination bonding.

Another important result of their collaboration was the partial elucidation of the molecular structure of certain compounds discovered by Liebig in the 1830s, including melon, melem, cyameluric acid, and hydromelonic acid. They realized that those compounds had a common core with formula C_{6}N_{7}, consisting of three fused triazine rings, now known as the heptazine core.

Among many other projects, Sturdivant helped Pauling to develop a device to measure the concentration of oxygen in gases. The patent for the device was assigned to the two and to Reuben Wood, and was donated to the on condition that the authors receive a fraction of any revenue coming from it.

As manager of the Caltech instrument shop, Sturdivant helped Pauling and Corey build their prototypes of the space-filling molecular models.

He was a member of the American Chemical Society, the American Physical Society, and the American Crystallographic Association.

A lecture hall at Caltech is named "J. Holmes Sturdivant".
