= C2N2 =

The molecular formula C_{2}N_{2} may refer to:

- Cyanogen
- Isocyanogen
