= Valence Industries =

Quantum Graphite
- Type: Public
- Traded as: ASX: VXL until 14 July 2017 then ASX: QGL
- Industry: Metals and Mining
- Founded: 2014
- Successor: Quantum Graphite
- Headquarters: Adelaide, Australia
- Products: Graphite
- Website: quantumgraphite.com

Quantum Graphite Limited (ASX:QGL), the owner of the century old Uley Mine and associated facilities near Port Lincoln in regional South Australia. The project is one of the largest coarse flake graphite deposits in the world. It is located on South Australia's Eastern Eyre Peninsula, acknowledged as a significant area of graphite mineralisation. The company was listed on the ASX in January 2014 and changed its name and listing code on 14 July 2017.

The Uley Mine was reopened in 2014 for approximately 12 months by the Valence Industries management to produce various graphite products for delivery to key customers in Europe and North Asia.

Quantum Graphite has prepared a definitive feasibility study for the next stage of mine development, the Uley 2 Project. An update to the feasibility study was released in December 2023. The project has all approvals required to commence production.

== Project overview ==
The Uley 2 Project is located near the major regional town of Port Lincoln, in the Lower Eyre Peninsula in South Australia.

The project contains near surface, disseminated, high-grade flake graphite. The project comprises two Mining Licences and two associated Retention Licences, plus an extensive Exploration Licence which provides the opportunity for project expansion in the future.

Quantum Graphite owns the land on which its current operations are conducted, including extensive existing infrastructure. It also owns the land where proposed expanded operations would be carried out.

== Project history ==
Graphite was discovered in the area of the Uley project in the early 1800s and was mined intermittently at the site since the 1920s. When in production, the open cut mine was capable of producing up to 14,000 tonnes of graphite concentrate annually. It was placed on care and maintenance in 1993 and was not worked again until 2014 when the company reported the first sales of graphite since the early 1990s.
