= Sturdivant (surname) =

Sturdivant is a surname. Notable people with the surname include:

- Ephraim Sturdivant (1782–1868), American veteran of the War of 1812
- James Holmes Sturdivant (1906–1972), research associate of Linus Pauling at Caltech
- J. Michael Sturdivant (born 2002), American football player
- John Sturdivant (born 1956), American football player
- Quan Sturdivant (born 1988), American football player
- Tom Sturdivant (1930–2009), American baseball player
- Trinton Sturdivant (born 1989), American football player
