= Azafullerene =

Fullerene with nitrogen atoms substituted for carbon

Azafullerenes are a class of heterofullerenes in which the element substituting for carbon is nitrogen. They can be in the form of a hollow sphere, ellipsoid, tube, and many other shapes. Spherical azafullerenes resemble the balls used in association football. They are also a member of the carbon nitride class of materials that include beta carbon nitride (β-C_{3}N_{4}), predicted to be harder than diamond. Besides the pioneering work of a couple of academic groups, this class of compounds has so far garnered little attention from the broader fullerene research community. Many properties and structures are yet to be discovered for the highly-nitrogen substituted subset of molecules.

Azafullerenes were first discovered in 1993 and reported in the California State Science Fair. The derivatives were formed in the gap between two graphite rods connected to an electric power supply. A small air leak led to contamination of the inert atmosphere and the subsequent reaction. The materials can also be formed by chemical reactions on fullerene or laser ablation of graphitic materials.

Subsequent work revealed a wide range of carbon nitride structures. Examples include (C_{59}N)_{2} (biazafullerenyl),C_{58}N_{2} (diaza[60]fullerene), C_{57}N_{3} (triaza[60]fullerene) and C_{48}N_{12}. The nitrogen atoms substitute for carbon atoms on the cage-like molecules. Much of the work has been theoretical in nature. The C_{48}N_{12} molecule was calculated to be an insulator, with the eight all-carbon rings forming regions of extended electron delocalization.
