= Heptazine =

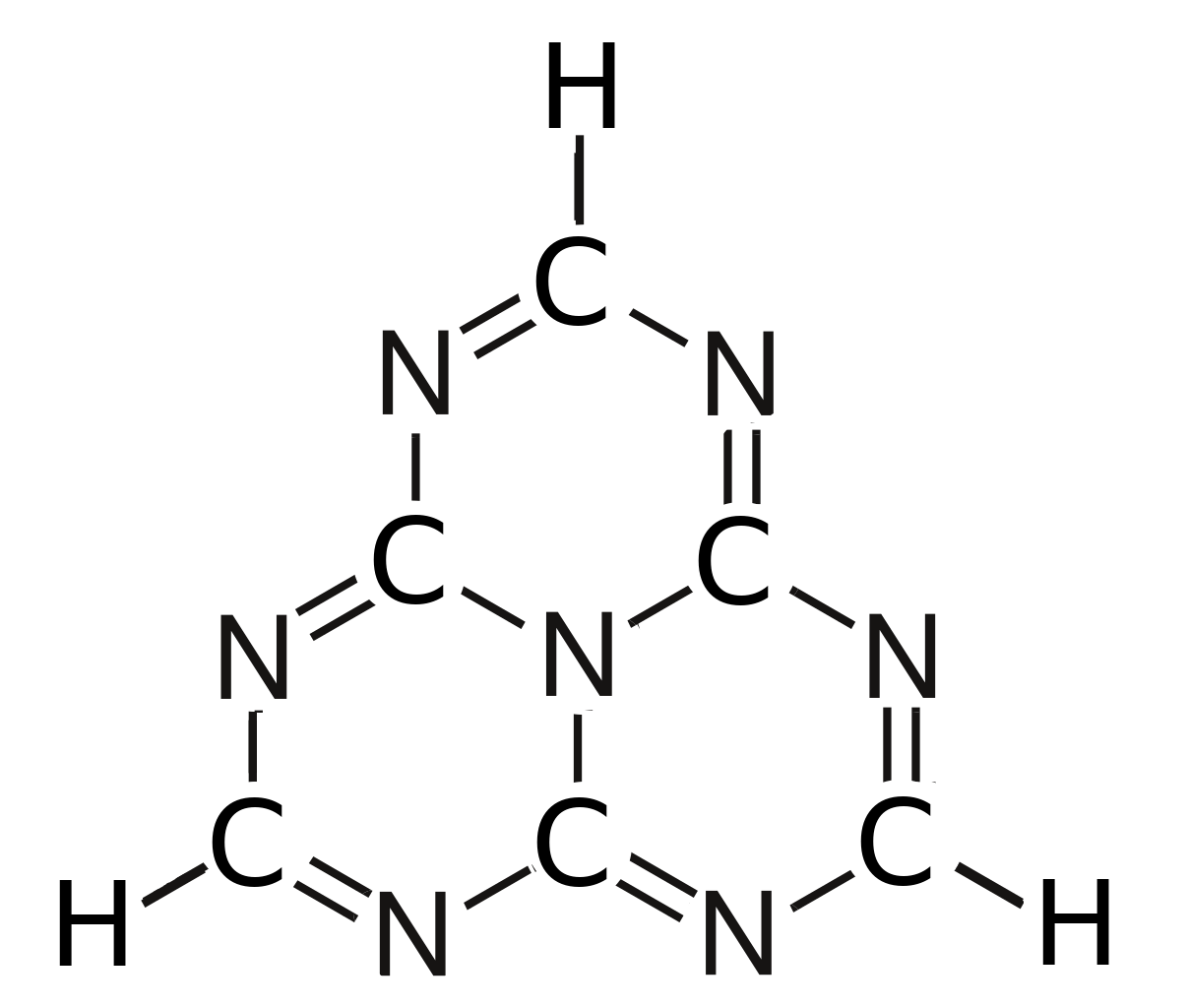

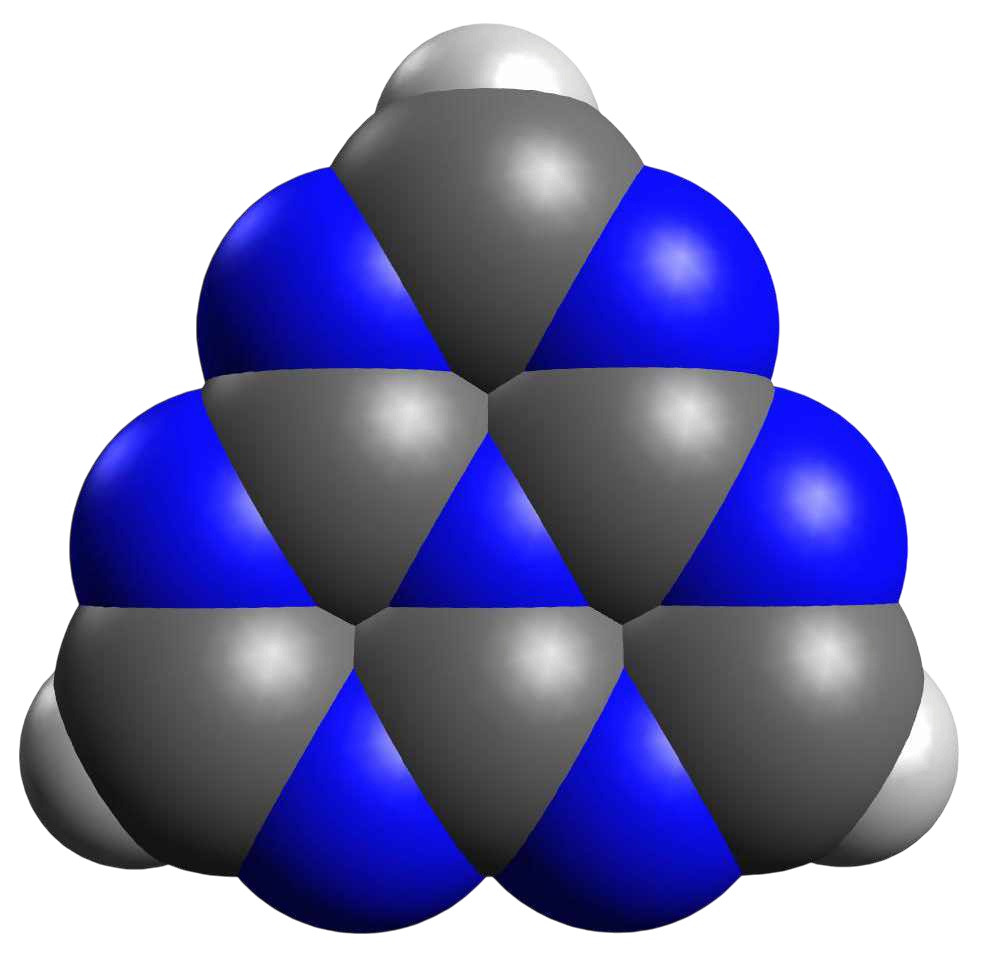

Names
- Preferred IUPAC name 1,3,3a^{1},4,6,7,9-Heptaazaphenalene
- Other names: Tri-s-triazine; 1,3,4,6,7,9-Hexaazacycl[3.3.3]azine

Identifiers
CAS Number	204-34-2
3D model (JSmol)	Interactive image
Beilstein Reference	5529795
ChEBI	CHEBI:38053
ChemSpider	119805
PubChem CID	136027
CompTox Dashboard (EPA)	DTXSID90174345
- InChI: InChI=1S/C6H3N7/c1-7-4-9-2-11-6-12-3-10-5(8-1)13(4)6/h1-3H Key: DKZXTOPFCDDGGX-UHFFFAOYSA-N
- SMILES: C1=NC2=NC=NC3=NC=NC(=N1)N23

Properties
Chemical formula	C_{6}H_{3}N_{7}
Molar mass	173.14 g/mol
Appearance	Yellow solid
Solubility in water	insoluble
Solubility	soluble in acetonitrile
- Except where otherwise noted, data are given for materials in their standard state (at 25 °C [77 °F], 100 kPa). Infobox references

Heptazine, or tri-s-triazine or cyamelurine, is a chemical compound with formula C_{6}N_{7}H_{3}, that consists of a planar triangular core group of three fused triazine rings, with three hydrogen atoms at the corners. It is a yellow, weakly fluorescent solid with melting point over 300 °C. It is soluble in organic solvents such as acetonitrile, but is decomposed by water and light.

The name "heptazine" is also used for derivative compounds, which have the three hydrogens substituted by other functional groups. Heptazine oligomers and polymers were discovered in the 19th century, but their study has long been hampered by their poor solubility. They are used as flame retardants. Heptazine derivatives have been the object of interest recently for potential applications in organic electronics, explosives, and more. The synthesis of heptazine proper was reported only in 1982.

== History ==
Berzelius discovered in 1815 that the ignition of mercuric thiocyanate (Hg(SCN)_{2}) yielded, besides cinnabar (HgS), carbon disulfide, and nitrogen, a yellow insoluble residue. In the same year, Wöhler described the characteristic twisted yellow column that forms when the salt is ignited and burns (which is the popular "Pharaoh's serpent" school chemistry demo). This foam has recently been found to consist of highly and randomly folded sheets of a material with composition close to C_{3}N_{4}. The sheets are very thin (less than 20 nm) and have been conjectured to consist of heptazine or tri-s-triazine cores linked at their corners by nitrogen atoms.

In 1834, Liebig described the compounds that he named melamine, melam, and melon. In the following years, Leopold Gmelin and Wilhelm Henneberg prepared novel salts that were eventually recognized as related to the compounds described by Liebig, and named melonates and cyamelurates.

The structure of these compounds was elucidated only in 1937, by Linus Pauling and J. Holmes Sturdivant. They showed by X-ray crystallography that these compounds contain a core C_{6}N_{7} of fused triazine rings, which they named "cyameluric nucleus".

The synthesis of unsubstituted heptazine was reported only in 1982, by R. S. Hosmane and others from the group of N. Leonard.

The structure of Liebig's melon was eventually identified by T. Komatsu as consisting of linked heptazine units.

== Structure and properties ==
According to Pauling and Sturdivant, the heptazine core is best described as a resonance equilibrium of 20 different structures:

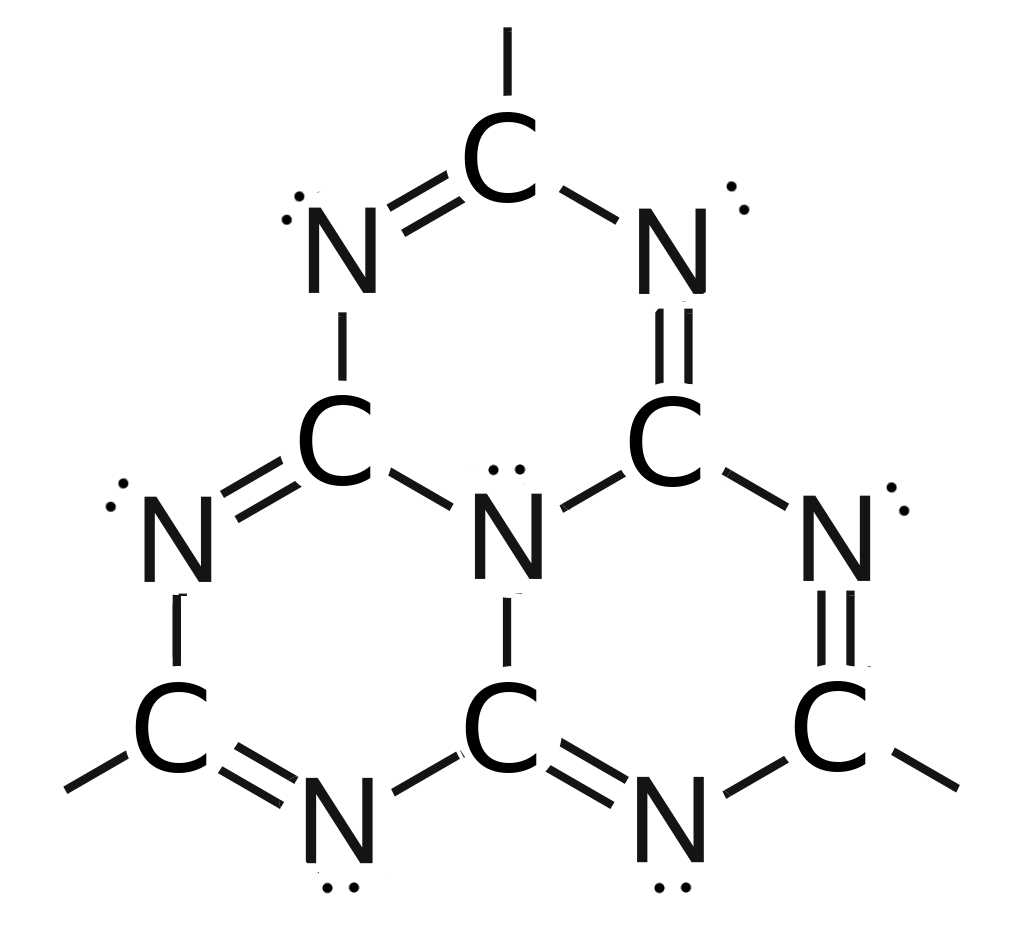
I.

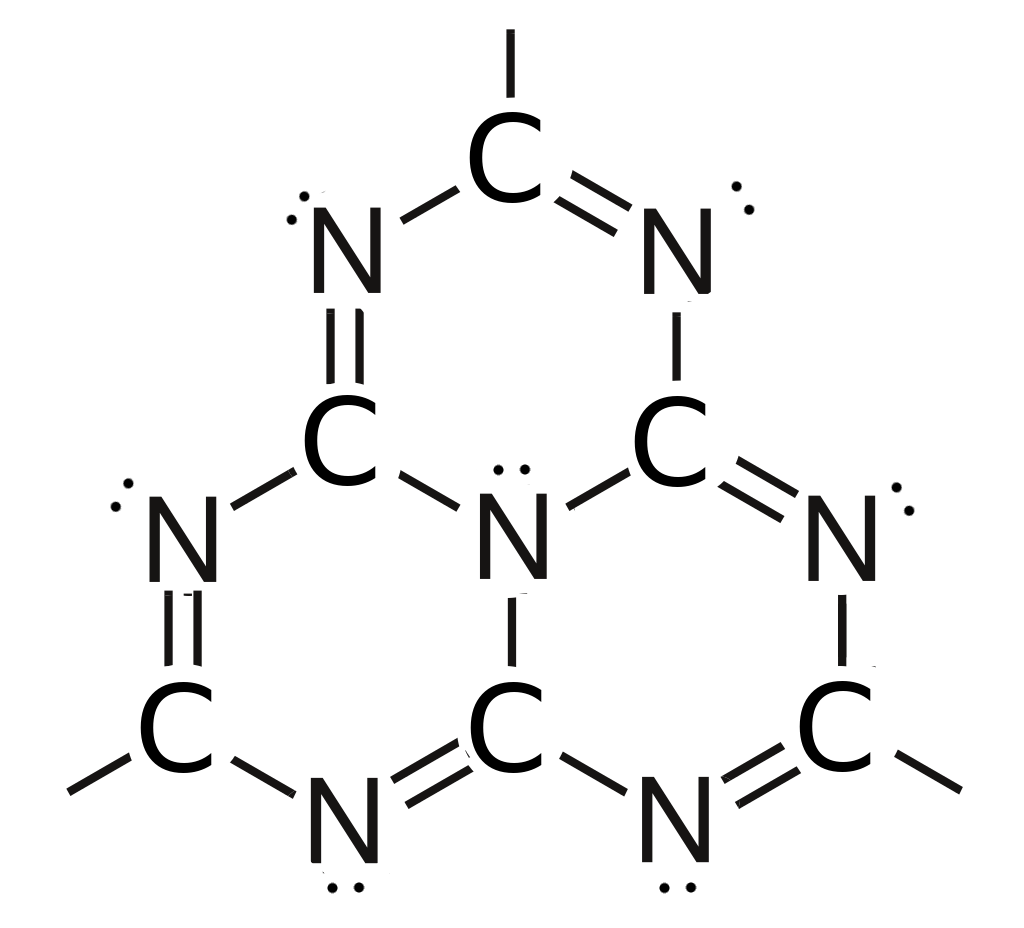
II.

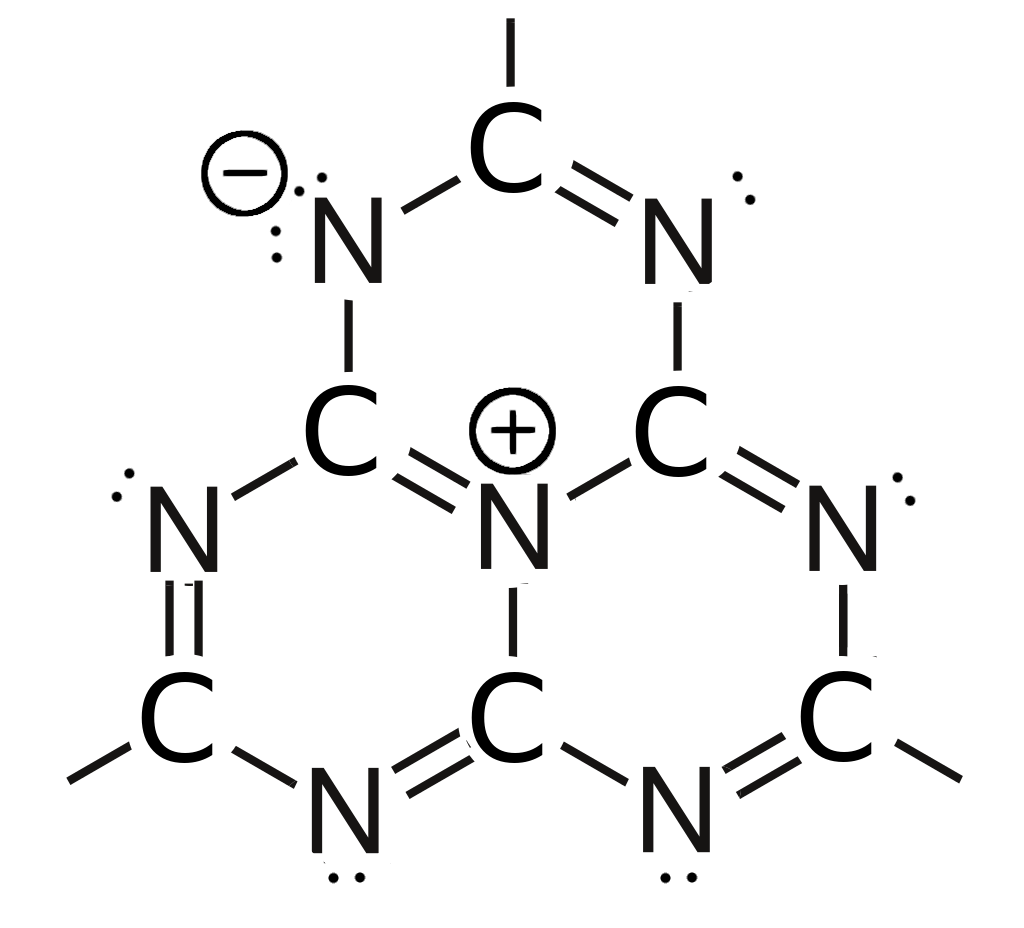
III to VIII.

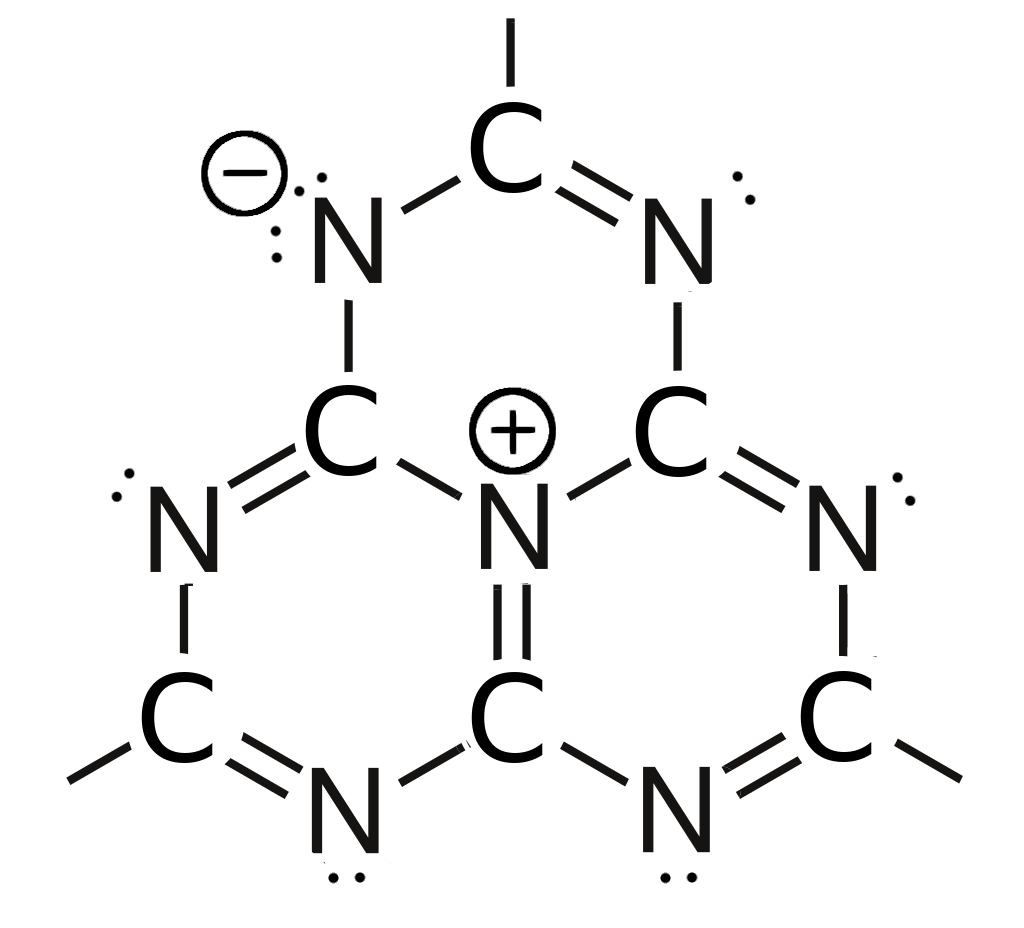
IX to XIV.

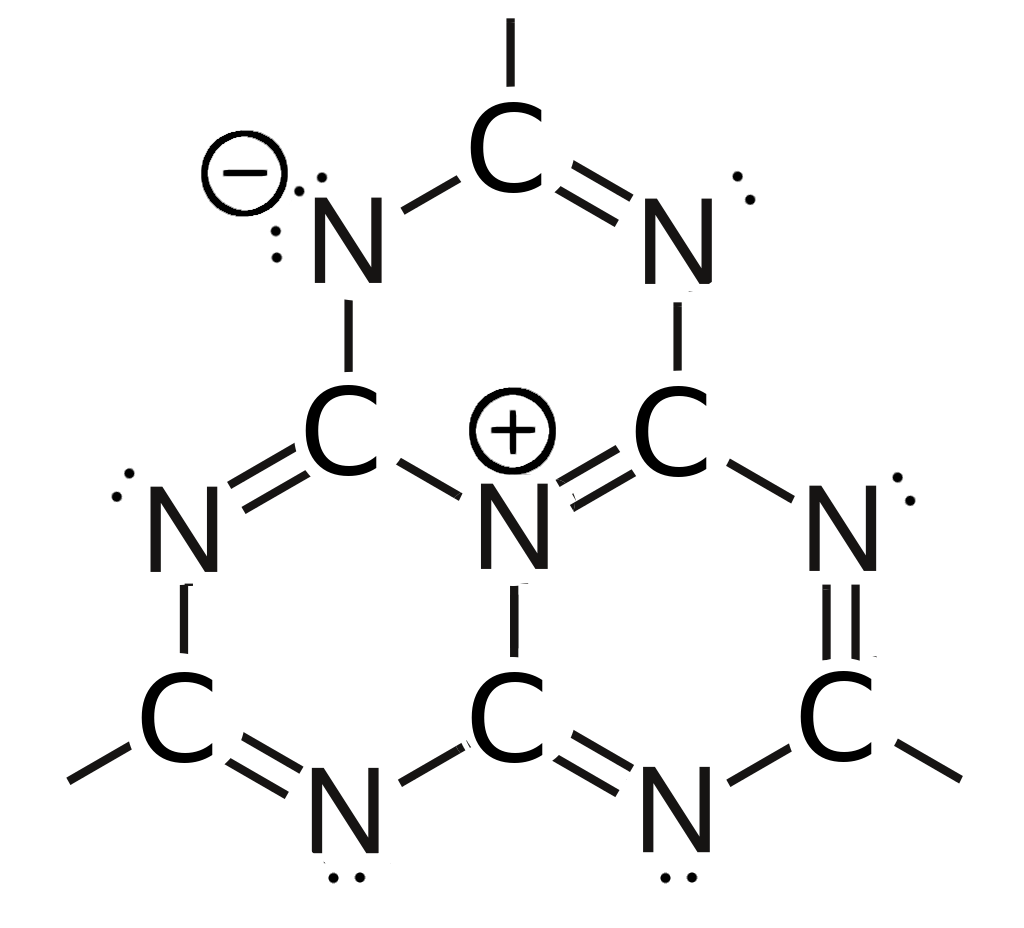
XV to XX.

Each of the last three structures above has 5 other versions that differ by rotation and/or mirroring of the whole molecule. If one averages pairs of structures that are equivalent through mirroring, or triplets equivalent through 120° rotations, the first 2 and the last 18 reduce to the following schemas:

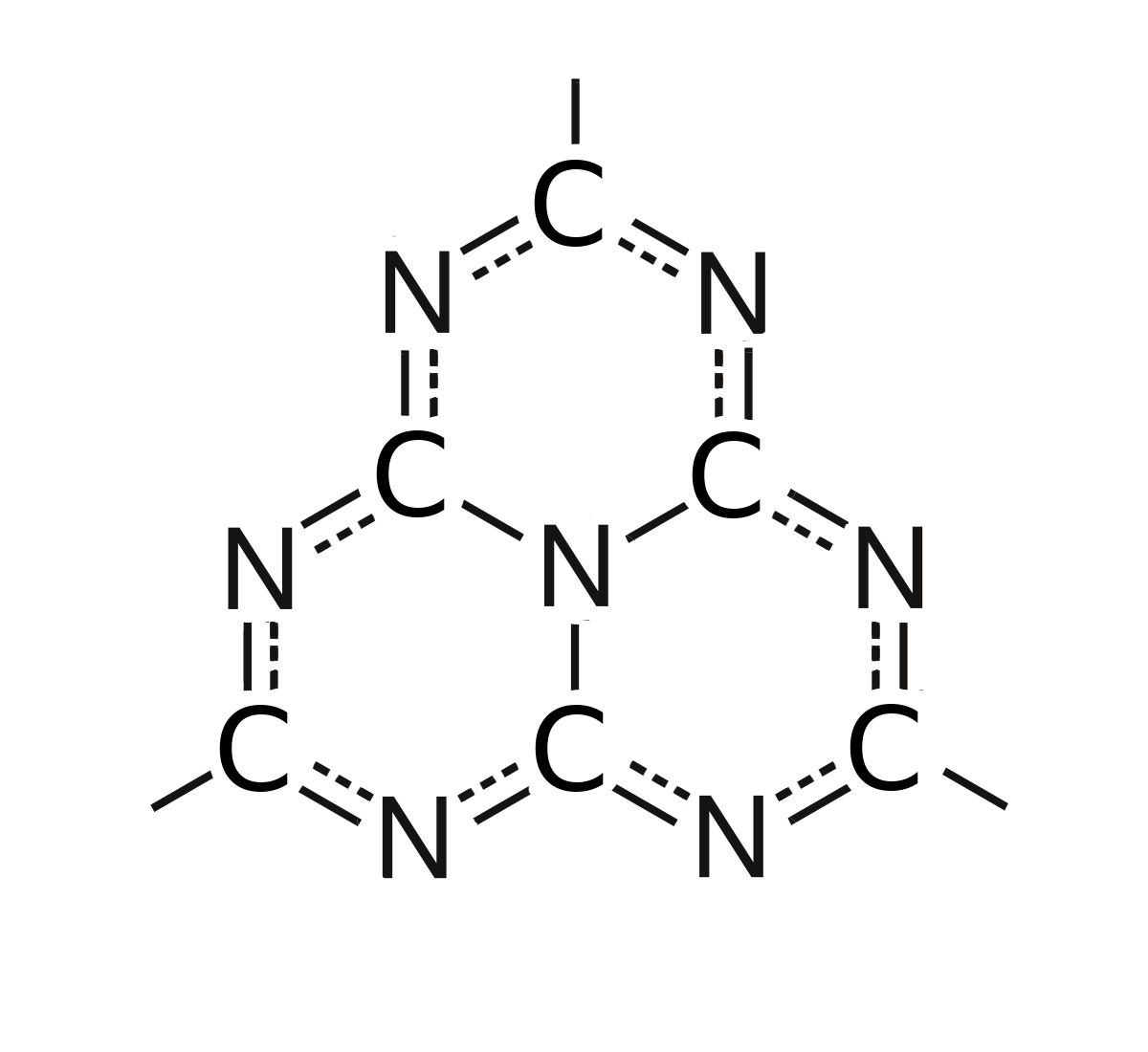
I and II
(neutral).

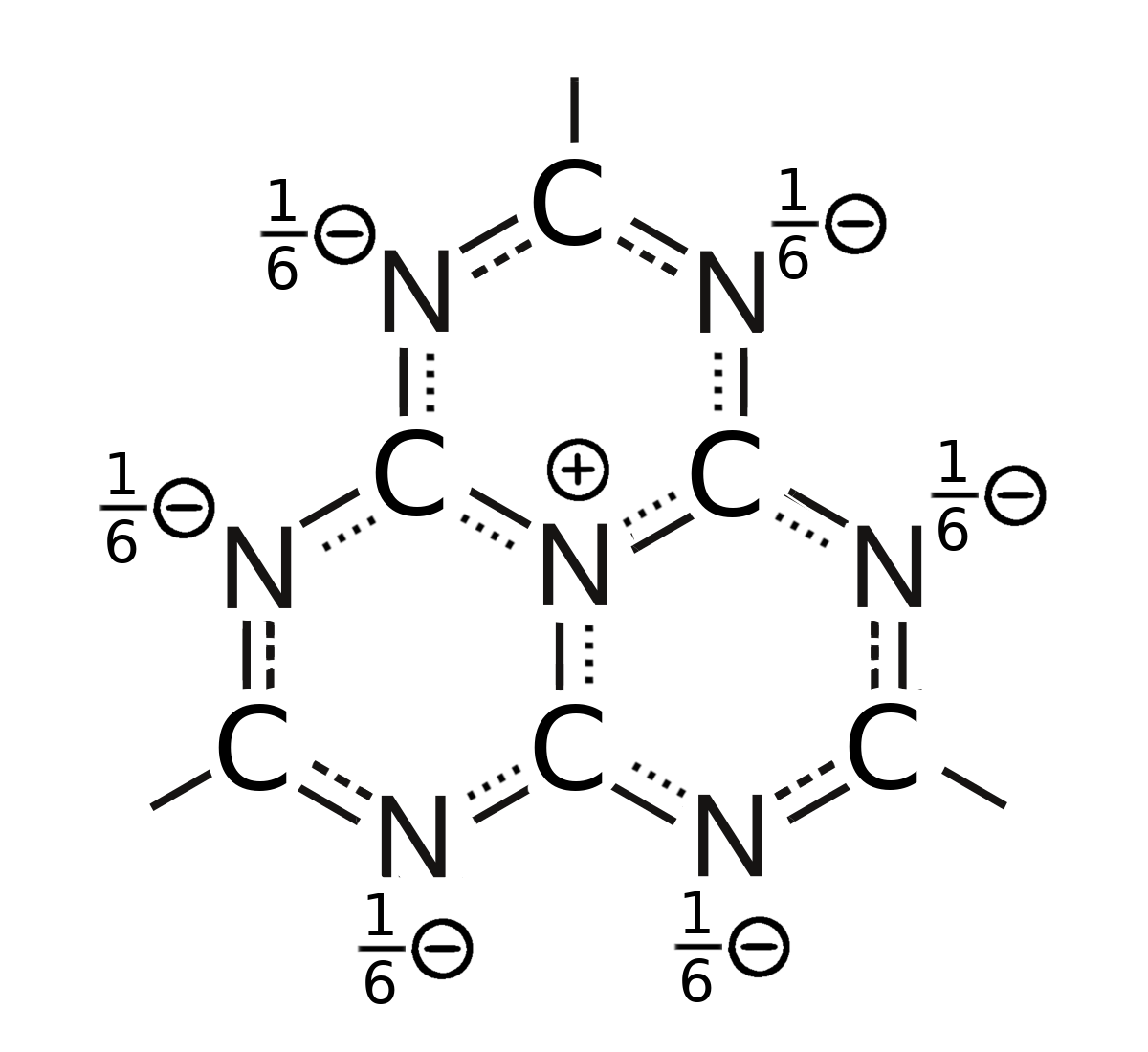
III through XX
(zwitterionic).

Each dashed or dotted line represents 1/2 or 1/3 of a covalent bond, respectively.

Heptazine has a peculiar crystal structure, whose cell spans 16 molecules in asymmetric positions and orientations.

Theoretical calculations indicate that, in heptazine and some of its derivatives, the lowest triplet state (T1) has higher energy (by about −0.25 eV) than the lowest excited singlet state (S1). Thus heptazine was claimed to be the first example of a stable closed-shell organic molecule violating Hund's rule.

== Derivatives and uses ==
Generic heptazine derivative; R_{1}, R_{2}, R_{3} are arbitrary substituents.

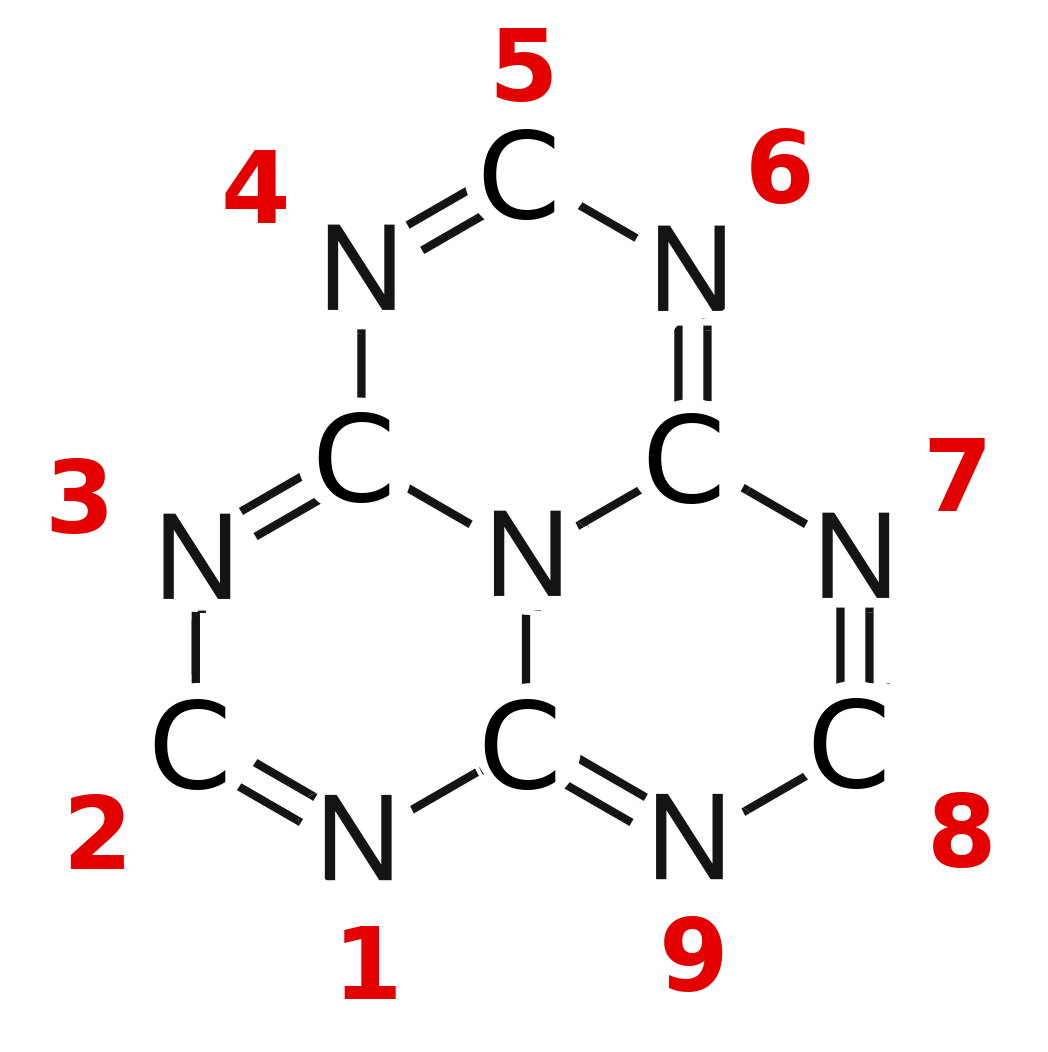
Usual numbering of substituent positions on the heptazine core. Attachment of groups to the nitrogens (positions 1,3,4,6,7,9) imply rearrangement of the single and double bonds.

The derivative with three amino substituents (2,5,8-triaminoheptazine) is called melem. Melem can be polymerized by condensation with loss of NH_{3}, so that the heptazine cores are linked through amine (NH) bridges. The oligomers and polymers thus obtained are called melon.

Melem and melon are effective flame retardant compounds. The compounds have in common that they melt or decompose at very high temperatures and that they are insoluble in any solvent. This makes characterization difficult.

The heptazine derivate with three hydroxyl substituents is called cyameluric acid.

The heptazine derivative with an azide substituent and two hydroxyl groups is called Linus Pauling's mystery molecule. It is the last molecule he drew on his chalkboard (preserved for posterity) before he died in 1994. Two theories attempt to lift the mystery. It is suggested that Pauling failed to solve the double helix structure of DNA before Watson and Crick because he viewed uracil as an amide and not as the tautomeric hydroxy compound. The other theory suggests that Pauling intended to use the compound as a potential spectroscopic label for binding to DNA. Nelson Leonard observed that Pauling "must have returned to the source of his original structural inspiration for a new application."

The tri-azido derivatives are investigated for their use as high-energy-density materials (explosives).

It is believed that one of the graphitic forms of the carbon nitride C_{3}N_{4} is built up of linked heptazines. Heptazines could be a precursor molecule to the diamond-like beta carbon nitride.
