= Borafullerene =

Fullerene with boron atoms substituted for carbon

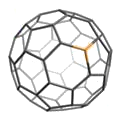
Borofullerene C_{59}B; carbon atoms are black/grey and boron is yellow

Borafullerenes are a class of heterofullerenes in which the element substituting for carbon is boron. They are also a member of the boron carbides class of materials that include boron carbide (B_{4}C).
