= Isocyanogen =

- Skeletal formula of icyanogen

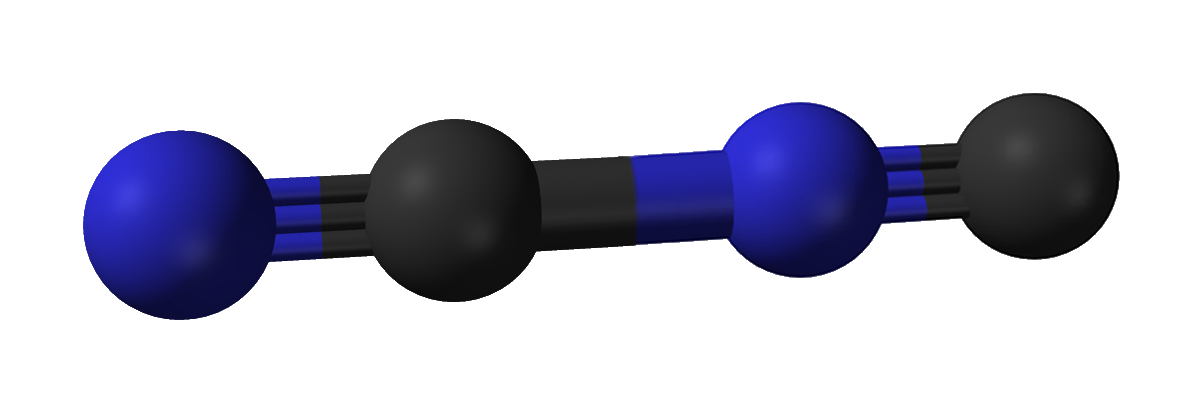
Ball and stick model of isocyanogen
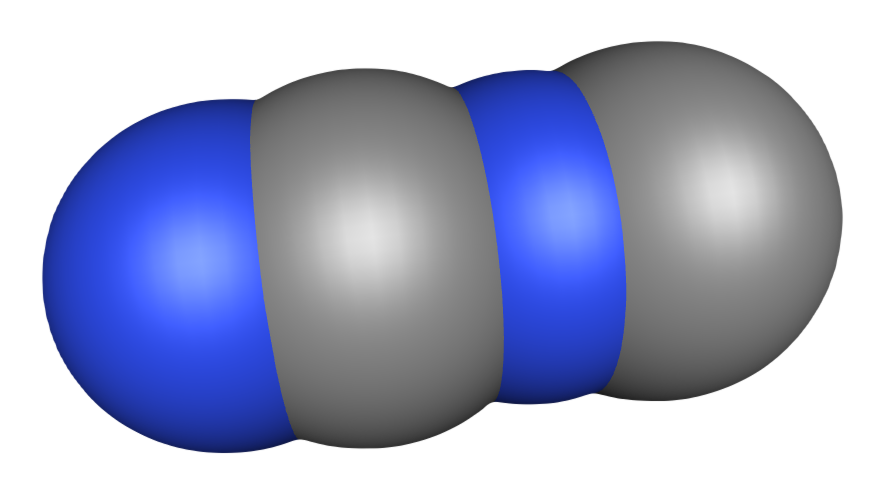
Spacefill model of isocyanogen

Names
- IUPAC name Isocyanogen
- Other names Cyanoisocyanogen

Identifiers
| CAS Number | 83951-85-3 |
| 3D model (JSmol) | Interactive image |
| ChemSpider | 13420259 |
| PubChem CID | 18431933 |
- InChI: InChI=1S/C2N2/c1-4-2-3 Key: NHFDIUPJVYYTLG-UHFFFAOYSA-N
- SMILES: [C-]#[N+]C#N

Properties
| Chemical formula | C_{2}N_{2} or CNCN |
| Molar mass | 52.034 g mol^{−1} |

Related compounds
| Related compounds | Cyanogen |
- Except where otherwise noted, data are given for materials in their standard state (at 25 °C [77 °F], 100 kPa). Infobox references

Isocyanogen, also known as cyanoisocyanogen, is a carbon nitride as well as a metastable isomer of cyanogen which has also been detected in the interstellar medium.

It is polar and is a ylide.

== Isomers ==
Besides the obvious isomer cyanogen, it also has another isomer, diisocyanogen.

The molecular structure of diisocyanogen

Diisocyanogen is the least stable of all C_{2}N_{2} isomers, and it polymerizes in solution at temperatures above -30 degrees celsius; despite this, its synthesis has been achieved.

However, unlike isocyanogen, it is nonpolar and has not been detected in the interstellar medium as of 2022.

== See also ==
- Cyanogen
