= Heterofullerene =

Fullerene with substituted carbon atoms

Heterofullerenes are classes of fullerenes, at least one carbon atom is replaced by another element. Based on spectroscopy, substitutions have been reported with boron (borafullerenes), nitrogen (azafullerenes), oxygen (oxafullerenes), arsenic (arsafullerenes), germanium (germafullerenes), phosphorus (phosphafullerenes), silicon (silafullerenes), iron (ferrafullerenes), copper (cuprafullerenes), nickel (nickelafullerenes), rhodium (rhodafullerenes) and iridium (iridafullerenes). Reports on isolated heterofullerenes are limited to those based on nitrogen and oxygen.
