= Melon (chemistry) =

Chemical compound

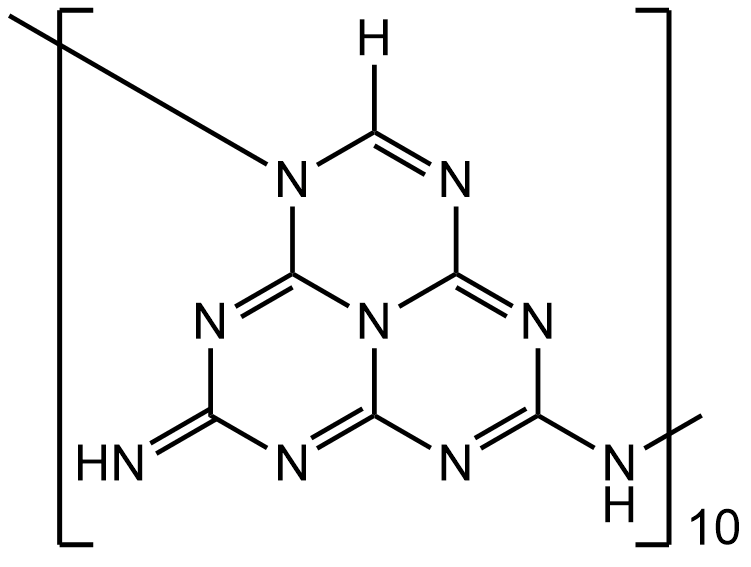
Repeating unit of melon, according to T. Komatsu (2001).

In chemistry, melon is a compound of carbon, nitrogen, and hydrogen of still somewhat uncertain composition, consisting mostly of heptazine units linked and closed by amine groups and bridges (−NH−, =NH, −NH_{2}, etc.). It is a pale yellow solid, insoluble in most solvents.

A study in 2001 determined the formula C_{60}N_{91}H_{33} for melon. Comprising ten imino-heptazine units forming a linear chain connected by amino-bridges as H(−C_{6}N_{8}H_{2})−NH−)_{10}(NH_{2}). Further research has proposed different structures.

Melon is the oldest known compound with a heptazine C_{6}N_{7} core - having been described in the early 19th century - but was little-studied until recently. It has since been recognized as a photocatalyst and possible precursor to carbon nitride.

== History ==
Liebig first described the compounds melamine, melam, and melon in 1834.

Melon received little attention for almost a century due to its inherent insolubility. In 1937, Linus Pauling characterised the structure of melon via X-ray crystallography, along with related compounds containing fused s-triazine rings.

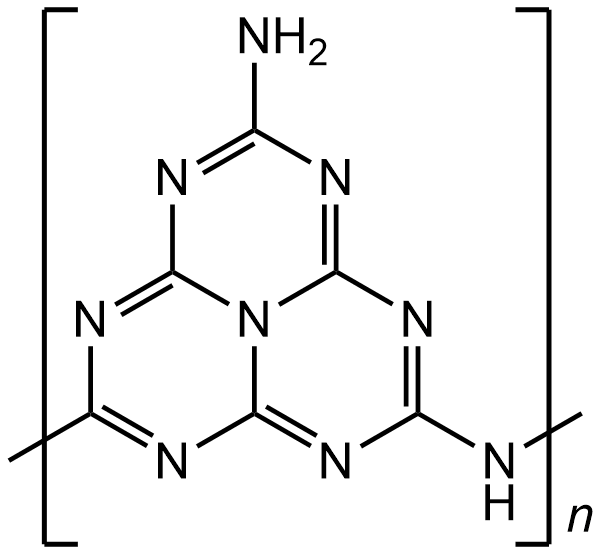
Structure of melon proposed by C. E. Redemann and H. J. Lucas (1940).

In 1940, C. E. Redemann and Howard J. Lucas proposed a structure consisting multiple 2-amino-heptazine units connected between carbons C5 and C8 by amine bridges. This structure was revised in 2001 by T. Komatsu, who proposed an isomeric structure.

== Preparation ==
Melon can be extracted from solid residue produced by thermal decomposition of ammonium thiocyanate (NH_{4}SCN) at 400 °C. Alternatively, thermal decomposition of solid melem yields graphitic carbon nitride.

== Structure and properties ==
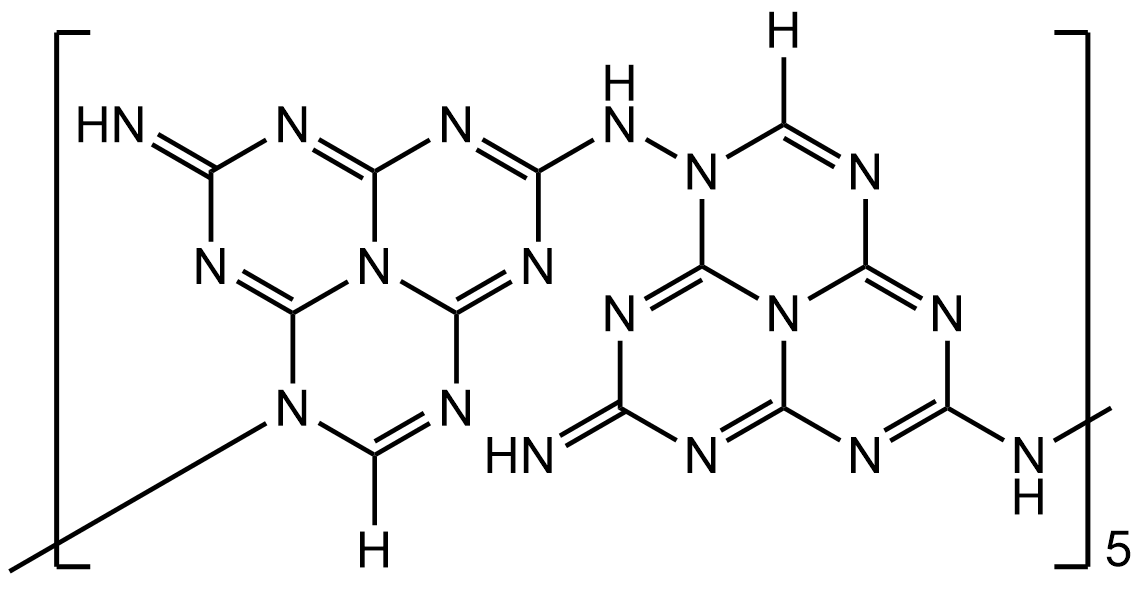
Structure of melon according to T. Komatsu (2001), showing two units.

Komatsu characterized a form of melon which comprises an oligomer of 10 units, formed by condensation of a melem tautomer via loss of an ammonia (NH_{3}) group. The resulting structure consists of 2-imino-heptazine units connected between a carbon (C8) on one unit to a nitrogen (N4) on the next via amino bridges. X-ray diffraction data, and other evidence, indicate the oligomer is planar, and the triangular heptazine cores have alternating orientations.

The crystal structure of melon is orthorhombic, with estimated lattice constants a = 739.6 pm, b = 2092.4 pm and c = 1295.4 pm.

=== Polymerization and decomposition ===
Heated to 700 °C, melon converts to a polymer of high molecular weight and longer chains with the same motif.

=== Chlorination ===
Melon can be converted to 2,5,8-trichloroheptazine, a useful reagent for synthesis of heptazine derivatives.

== Applications ==
=== Photocatalysis ===
In 2009, Xinchen Wang et al. observed that melon could act as a catalyst for water splitting - to its respective hydrogen (H) and oxygen (O) ions - and, in the presence of uv light (sunlight), photocatalytic conversion of CO_{2} back to fuel. The latter reaction led to melon being circumscribed as the first metal-free photocatalyst providing several advantages compared previous catalytic compounds - namely, low material cost, simple synthesis, negligible toxicity, and very high chemical and thermal stability. Although melon is only modestly efficient at converting CO_{2}, the reaction speed can be improved by doping or nanostructuring.

=== Carbon nitride precursor ===
Another wave of interest for melon occurred in the 1990s, where theoretical computations suggested β-C_{3}N_{4} - a hypothetical carbon nitride compound structurally analogous to β-Si_{3}N_{4} - may be harder than diamond. In addition, melon showed promise as a useful precursor for "graphitic" carbon nitride (g-C_{3}N_{4}).

== See also ==
- Melem
- Melam
