= Melam (chemistry) =

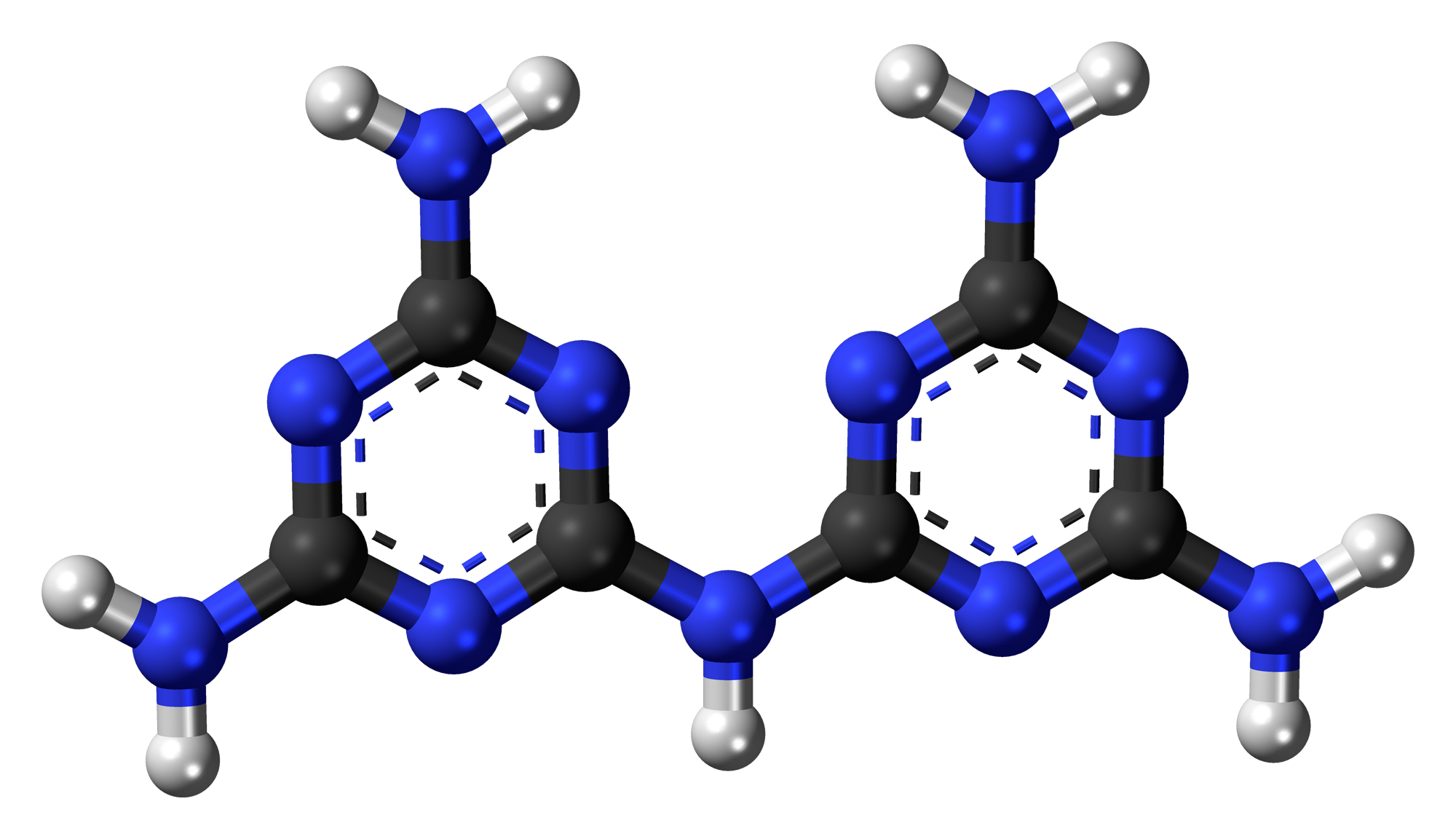

Names
- IUPAC name N2-(4,6-Diamino-1,3,5-triazin-2-yl)-1,3,5-triazine-2,4,6-triamine
- Other names A1,3,5-Triazine-2,4,6-triamine

Identifiers
| CAS Number | 3576-88-3 |
| 3D model (JSmol) | Interactive image |
| ChemSpider | 69563 |
| ECHA InfoCard | 100.020.632 |
| EC Number | 222-695-1 |
| PubChem CID | 77125 |
| UNII | 763B6VP74S |
| CompTox Dashboard (EPA) | DTXSID50957156 |
- InChI: InChI=1S/C6H9N11/c7-1-11-2(8)14-5(13-1)17-6-15-3(9)12-4(10)16-6/h(H9,7,8,9,10,11,12,13,14,15,16,17) Key: YZEZMSPGIPTEBA-UHFFFAOYSA-N; InChI=1/C6H9N11/c7-1-11-2(8)14-5(13-1)17-6-15-3(9)12-4(10)16-6/h(H9,7,8,9,10,11,12,13,14,15,16,17) Key: YZEZMSPGIPTEBA-UHFFFAOYAX
- SMILES: C1(=NC(=NC(=N1)NC2=NC(=NC(=N2)N)N)N)N

Properties
| Chemical formula | C_{6}H_{9}N_{11} |
| Molar mass | 235.21 g/mol |
| Appearance | white powder |
| Solubility in water | insoluble |
| Solubility | slightly soluble in acids |
- Except where otherwise noted, data are given for materials in their standard state (at 25 °C [77 °F], 100 kPa). verify (what is ?) Infobox references

Melam (N2-(4,6-diamino-1,3,5-triazin-2-yl)-1,3,5-triazine-2,4,6-triamine) is a condensation product of melamine.

== Synthesis ==
Melam was discovered by Liebig in 1834 from the residue of heating ammonium thiocyanate.

== Properties ==
In the presence of 30% ammonia, melam undergoes hydrolysis to form ammeline and melamine. It also reacts with concentrated nitric acid, producing cyanuric acid.

Upon heating, melam first loses ammonia to form melem, and then melon.
