= Graphitic carbon nitride =

Class of chemical compounds

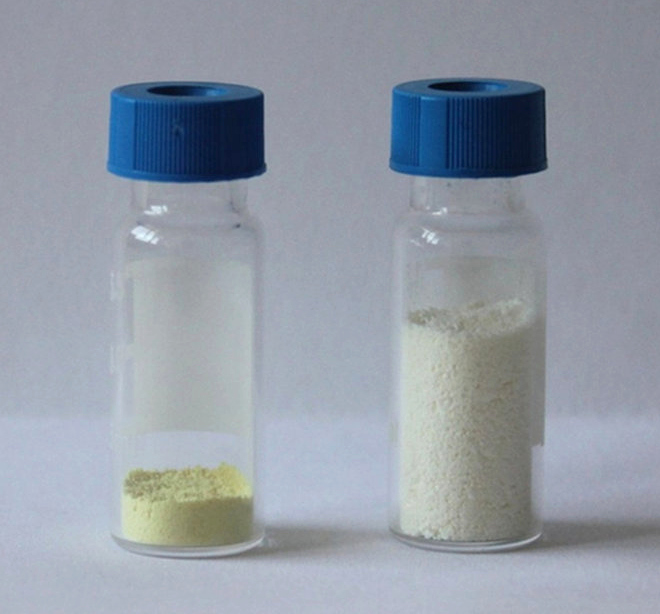
Comparison of bulk g-C_{3}N_{4} (left) and nanosheet g-C_{3}N_{4} powders, 100 mg each.

Graphitic carbon nitride (g-C_{3}N_{4}) is a family of carbon nitride compounds with a general formula near to C_{3}N_{4} (albeit typically with non-zero amounts of hydrogen) and two major substructures based on heptazine and poly(triazine imide) units which, depending on reaction conditions, exhibit different degrees of condensation, properties and reactivities.

== Preparation ==
Graphitic carbon nitride can be made by polymerization of cyanamide, dicyandiamide or melamine. The firstly formed polymeric C_{3}N_{4} structure, melon, with pendant amino groups, is a highly ordered polymer. Further reaction leads to more condensed and less defective C_{3}N_{4} species, based on tri-s-triazine (C_{6}N_{7}) units as elementary building blocks.

Graphitic carbon nitride can also be prepared by electrodeposition on Si(100) substrate from a saturated acetone solution of cyanuric trichloride and melamine (ratio =1: 1.5) at room temperature.

Well-crystallized graphitic carbon nitride nanocrystallites can also be prepared via benzene-thermal reaction between C_{3}N_{3}Cl_{3} and NaNH_{2} at 180–220 °C for 8–12 h.

Recently, a new method of syntheses of graphitic carbon nitrides by heating at 400-600 °C of a mixture of melamine and uric acid in the presence of alumina has been reported. Alumina favored the deposition of the graphitic carbon nitrides layers on the exposed surface. This method can be assimilated to an in situ chemical vapor deposition (CVD).

== Characterization ==
Characterization of crystalline g-C_{3}N_{4} can be carried out by identifying the triazine ring existing in the products by X-ray photoelectron spectroscopy (XPS) measurements, photoluminescence spectra and Fourier transform infrared spectroscopy (FTIR) spectrum (peaks at 800 cm^{−1}, 1310 cm^{−1} and 1610 cm^{−1}).

== Properties ==
Due to the special semiconductor properties of carbon nitrides, they show unexpected catalytic activity for a variety of reactions, such as for the activation of benzene, trimerization reactions, and also the activation of carbon dioxide (artificial photosynthesis).

== Uses ==
A commercial graphitic carbon nitride is available under the brand name Nicanite. In its micron-sized graphitic form, it can be used for tribological coatings, biocompatible medical coatings, chemically inert coatings, insulators and for energy storage solutions. Graphitic carbon nitride is reported as one of the best hydrogen storage materials. It can also be used as a support for catalytic nanoparticles.

== Areas of interest ==
Due to their properties (primarily large, tuneable band gaps and efficient intercalation of salts) graphitic carbon nitrides are under research for a variety of applications:

- Photocatalysts
  - Decomposition of water to H_{2} and O_{2}
  - Degradation of pollutants
- Large band gap semiconductor
- Heterogeneous catalyst and support
  - The significant resilience of carbon nitrides combined with surface and intralayer reactivities make them potentially useful catalysts relying on their labile protons and Lewis base functionalities. Modifications such as doping, protonation and molecular functionalisation can be exploited to improve selectivity and performance.
  - Nanoparticle catalysts supported on gCN are under development for both proton exchange membrane fuel cells and water electrolyzers.
  - Despite graphitic carbon nitride having some advantages, such as mild band gap (2.7 eV), absorption of visible light and flexibility, it still has limitations for practical applications due to low efficiency of visible light utilization, high recombination rate of the photo generated charge carriers, low electrical conductivity and small specific surface area (<10 m^{2}g^{−1}). To modify these shortages, one of the most attractive approaches is doping graphitic carbon nitride with carbon nanomaterials, such as carbon nanotubes. First, carbon nanotubes have large specific surface area, so they can provide more sites to separate the charge carriers, then decrease the recombination rate of the charge carriers and further increase the activity of reduction reaction. Second, carbon nanotubes show high electron conducting ability, which means they can improve graphitic carbon nitride with visible light response, efficient charge carrier separation and transfer, thereby improving its electronic properties. Third, carbon nanotubes can be regarded as a kind of narrow band semiconductor material, also known as a photosensitizer, which can extend the range of the light absorption of semiconductor photocatalytic material, thereby enhancing its utilization of visible light.
- Energy Storage materials
  - Due to the intercalation of Li being able to occur to more sites than for graphite due to intra layer voids in addition to intercalation between layers, gCN can store a large amount of Li making them potentially useful for rechargeable batteries.

== See also ==
- Beta carbon nitride
