= Melem =

Names
- IUPAC name 11-imino-2,4,6,8,10,12,13-heptazatricyclo[7.3.1.0^{5,13}]trideca-1(12),2,4,7,9-pentaene-3,7-diamine
- Other names 2,5,8-triamino-heptazine; 2,5,8-triamino-tri-s-triazine; cyamelurotriamide; triamino-s-heptazine; 1,3,4,6,7,9,9b-Heptaazaphenalene-2,5,8-triamine

Identifiers
CAS Number	1502-47-2
3D model (JSmol)	Interactive image
Beilstein Reference	27284
ChEBI	CHEBI:38055
ChemSpider	4575652
ECHA InfoCard	100.014.657
EC Number	216-122-4
Gmelin Reference	241276
PubChem CID	73919
UNII	WP6U3U42XL
CompTox Dashboard (EPA)	DTXSID40164493
- InChI: InChI=1S/C6H6N10/c7-1-10-4-12-2(8)14-6-15-3(9)13-5(11-1)16(4)6/h(H6,7,8,9,10,11,12,13,14,15) Key: YSRVJVDFHZYRPA-UHFFFAOYSA-N
- SMILES: C1(=NC2=NC(=N)N=C3N2C(=NC(=N3)N)N1)N

Properties
Chemical formula	C_{6}H_{6}N_{10}
Molar mass	218.18 g/mol
Appearance	white solid
- Except where otherwise noted, data are given for materials in their standard state (at 25 °C [77 °F], 100 kPa). Infobox references

In chemistry, melem is a compound with formula C_{6}N_{10}H_{6}; specifically, 2,5,8-triamino-heptazine or 2,5,8-triamino-tri-s-triazine, whose molecule can be described as that of heptazine with the three hydrogen atoms replaced by amino groups. It is a white crystalline solid.

== Preparation ==
Melem can be prepared by thermal decomposition of various C−N−H compounds, such as melamine C_{3}N_{3}(NH_{2})_{3}, dicyandiamide H_{4}C_{2}N_{4}, ammonium dicyanamide NH_{4}[N(CN)_{2}], cyanamide H_{2}CN_{2}, at 400 to 450 °C.

== Structure and properties ==
=== Crystal structure ===
Melem crystallizes in the group P21/c (No. 14), with parameters a = 739.92(1) pm, b = 865.28(3) pm, c = 1338.16(4) pm, β = 99.912(2)°, and Z = 4. The almost-planar molecules are arranged in parallel layers spaced 327 pm apart. The molecule is in the triamino form, rather than one of the possible tautomers.

=== Thermal decomposition ===
When heated above 560°, melem transforms into a graphite-like C−N material.

=== Melemium cations ===
Melem accepts up to three protons yielding cations called melemium [(NH_{2})_{3}(C_{6}N_{7}H_{x})]^{x+}. Some salts described in the literature are melemium sulfate, [(NH_{2})_{3}(C_{6}N_{7}H_{2})]SO_{4} • 2H_{2}O, melemium perchlorate, [(NH_{2})_{3}(C_{6}N_{7}H)]ClO_{4} • H_{2}O, melemium hydrogensulfate [(NH_{2})_{3}(C_{6}N_{7}H_{3})](HSO_{4})_{3} and two melemium methylsulfonates [(NH_{2})_{3}(C_{6}N_{7}H_{2})](SO_{3}CH_{3})_{2} • H_{2}O and [(NH_{2})_{3}(C_{6}N_{7}H)][(NH_{2})_{3}(C_{6}N_{7}H_{2})](SO_{3}CH_{3})_{3} • H_{2}O. The protons can be inserted in any of the six outer nitrogen atoms of the heptazine core, yielding many tautomers of apparently similar energies.

== See also ==
- Triazine H_{3}C_{3}N_{3}, with a single C-N ring
- Melamine (NH_{2})_{3}(C_{3}N_{3}), triamino triazine
- Melaminium [H(NH_{2})_{3}(C_{3}N_{3})]^{+}, a cation derived from melamine
- Melam ((NH_{2})_{2}(C_{3}N_{3}))_{2}NH, a condensation dimer of melamine
- Melamium [H((NH_{2})_{2}(C_{3}N_{3}))_{2}NH]^{+}, a cation derived from melam
- Melon (NH_{2})(NH(C_{6}N_{7}H)NH)_{n}H, a condensation oligomer of melem
