= Bromomethyl ethyl ketone =

Names
- IUPAC name 1-Bromobutan-2-one
- Other names Bn-Stoff; Homomartonite; TL-819

Identifiers
CAS Number	816-40-0
3D model (JSmol)	Interactive image
ChemSpider	12604
ECHA InfoCard	100.011.301
PubChem CID	13156
UNII	4UPM4J7CVA
CompTox Dashboard (EPA)	DTXSID00231216
- InChI: InChI=1S/C4H7BrO/c1-2-4(6)3-5/h2-3H2,1H3 Key: CCXQVBSQUQCEEO-UHFFFAOYSA-N
- SMILES: CCC(=O)CBr

Properties
Chemical formula	C_{4}H_{7}BrO
Molar mass	151.003 g·mol^{−1}
- Except where otherwise noted, data are given for materials in their standard state (at 25 °C [77 °F], 100 kPa). Infobox references

Bromomethyl ethyl ketone is a brominated ketone with lachrymatory effects. It was used as a chemical warfare agent in World War I. Bromomethyl ethyl ketone was developed as an alternative to bromoacetone, because acetone, the precursor to bromoacetone, was required for explosives production.

== See also ==
- Bromoacetone
- Chloroacetone
- Iodoacetone
- Bromobenzyl cyanide
- Chloroacetophenone
- Ethyl bromoacetate
- Ethyl iodoacetate
