= Cyanuric bromide =

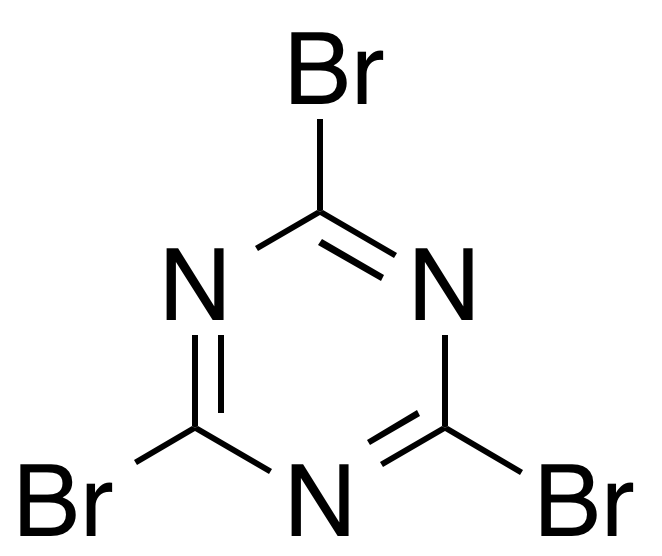

Names
- IUPAC name 2,4,6-tribromo-1,3,5-triazine

Identifiers
CAS Number	14921-00-7
3D model (JSmol)	Interactive image
ChemSpider	25112
PubChem CID	26967
UNII	F6S2VES5UF
CompTox Dashboard (EPA)	DTXSID90274819
- InChI: InChI=1S/C3Br3N3/c4-1-7-2(5)9-3(6)8-1 Key: VHYBUUMUUNCHCK-UHFFFAOYSA-N
- SMILES: C1(=NC(=NC(=N1)Br)Br)Br

Properties
Chemical formula	C_{3}Br_{3}N_{3}
Molar mass	317.766 g·mol^{−1}
Melting point	264.5 °C (508.1 °F; 537.6 K)

Related compounds
Other anions	Cyanuric fluoride; Cyanuric chloride
Related compounds	cyanogen bromide Tribromoisocyanuric acid
- Except where otherwise noted, data are given for materials in their standard state (at 25 °C [77 °F], 100 kPa). Infobox references

Cyanuric bromide is a heterocyclic compound with formula C_{3}N_{3}Br_{3}. It contains a six-membered ring of alternating nitrogen and carbon atoms, with a bromine atom attached to each carbon. It is formed by the spontaneous trimerisation of cyanogen bromide.

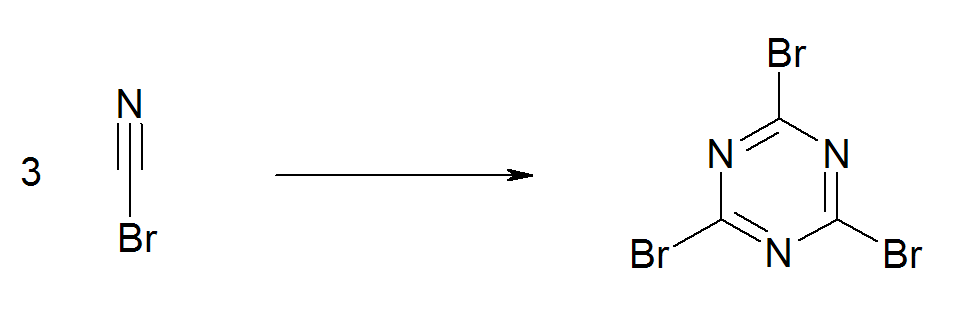

== Reactions ==
Cyanuric bromide can be used to synthesize substituted triazines. For example it reacts with anilines to form derivatives of melamine. With ammonia, melamine is produced. Primary or secondary amines react. Cyanuric trihydrazide is produced in the reaction with hydrazine. When heated with urea at 140 °C, ammelide is formed.

Cyanuric bromide reacts with water, particularly in alkaline conditions to cyanuric acid and hydrogen bromide.

Cyanuric bromide can add bromine to other compounds and when it is heated with acetic acid, acetyl bromide is produced.

== Formation ==
Cyanuric bromide can form in a reaction with potassium ferrocyanide with bromine at 200 °C. The trimerization reaction of cyanogen bromide (BrCN) is catalyzed by aluminium trichloride or hydrogen bromide.
