= 2-Chloro-4,6-dimethoxy-1,3,5-triazine =

Names
- IUPAC name 2-chloro-4,6-dimethoxy-1,3,5-triazine
- Other names CDMT

Identifiers
CAS Number	3140-73-6
3D model (JSmol)	Interactive image
ChEMBL	ChEMBL1631172
ChemSpider	17426
ECHA InfoCard	100.019.583
EC Number	221-541-0
PubChem CID	18450
UNII	6KB2H8FE5Q
CompTox Dashboard (EPA)	DTXSID60185322
- InChI: InChI=1S/C5H6ClN3O2/c1-10-4-7-3(6)8-5(9-4)11-2/h1-2H3 Key: GPIQOFWTZXXOOV-UHFFFAOYSA-N
- SMILES: COc1nc(Cl)nc(OC)n1

Properties
Chemical formula	C_{5}H_{6}ClN_{3}O_{2}
Molar mass	175.57 g·mol^{−1}
Appearance	White crystalline solid
Melting point	71–74 °C (160–165 °F; 344–347 K)

Hazards
- GHS labelling
Pictograms	(GHS05: Corrosive) (GHS07: Exclamation mark) (GHS09: Environmental hazard)
Signal word	Danger
Hazard statements	H302, H315, H317, H318, H319, H335, H411
Precautionary statements	P261, P264, P264+P265, P270, P271, P272, P273, P280, P301+P317, P302+P352, P304+P340, P305+P351+P338, P305+P354+P338, P317, P319, P321, P330, P332+P317, P337+P317, P362+P364, P391, P403+P233, P405, P501
Safety data sheet (SDS)	Sigma-Aldrich
- Except where otherwise noted, data are given for materials in their standard state (at 25 °C [77 °F], 100 kPa). Infobox references

2-Chloro-4,6-dimethoxy-1,3,5-triazine (CDMT) is a triazine derivative commonly used in acylation reactions for the synthesis of amides and esters as well as for activation of alcohols in a diverse range of other reactions. Almost exclusively used with N-methylmorpholine (NMM) as a Brønsted base, its reactivity is closely related to DMTMM.

== Preparation ==
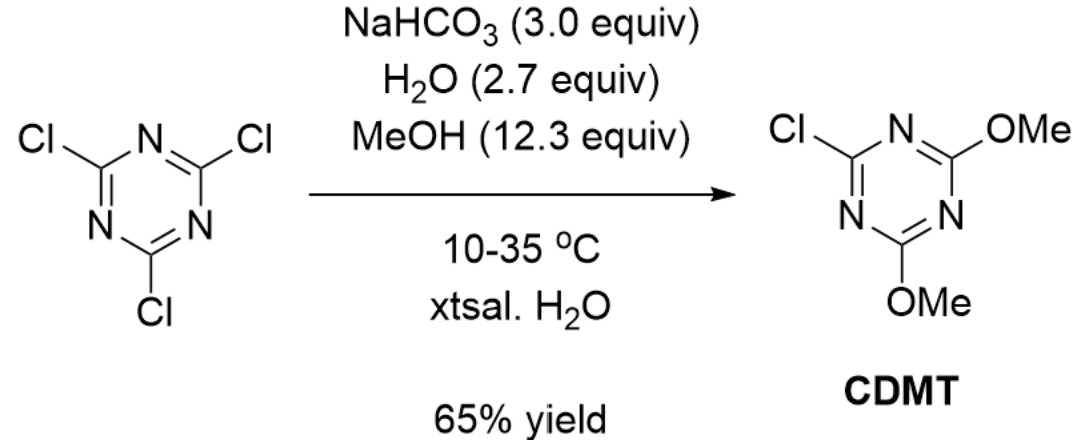

CDMT can be prepared from cyanuric chloride in a mixture of methanol, water and sodium bicarbonate. CDMT directly precipitates from this aqueous reaction mixture, but careful control of base stoichiometry and temperature is required to obtain high selectivity between the mono-, di- and trimethoxy-triazines and prepare CDMT in high yield. DMTMM is prepared in a nucleophilic aromatic substitution between CDMT and NMM.

== Uses ==
CDMT is a general reagent for acylation of carboxylic acids, providing access to amides and esters in high yields under mild conditions. NMM is almost exclusively used as the Brønsted base in acylation and the reactivity of CDMT is hard to distinguish from DMTMM in the context of acylations. The activated ester intermediate in these reactions is the 2-acyloxy-4,6-dimethoxy-1,3,5-triazine which has been characterized using IR and NMR spectroscopy. CDMT has been shown to form a wide variety of amidations, including peptides, with low risk of epimerization. CMDT has been successfully used at multikilogram scales to prepare the secondary amide in the antitumor agent Pemetrexed. In the case of esterification, broad reactivity is observed but the addition of magnesium chloride is often required.

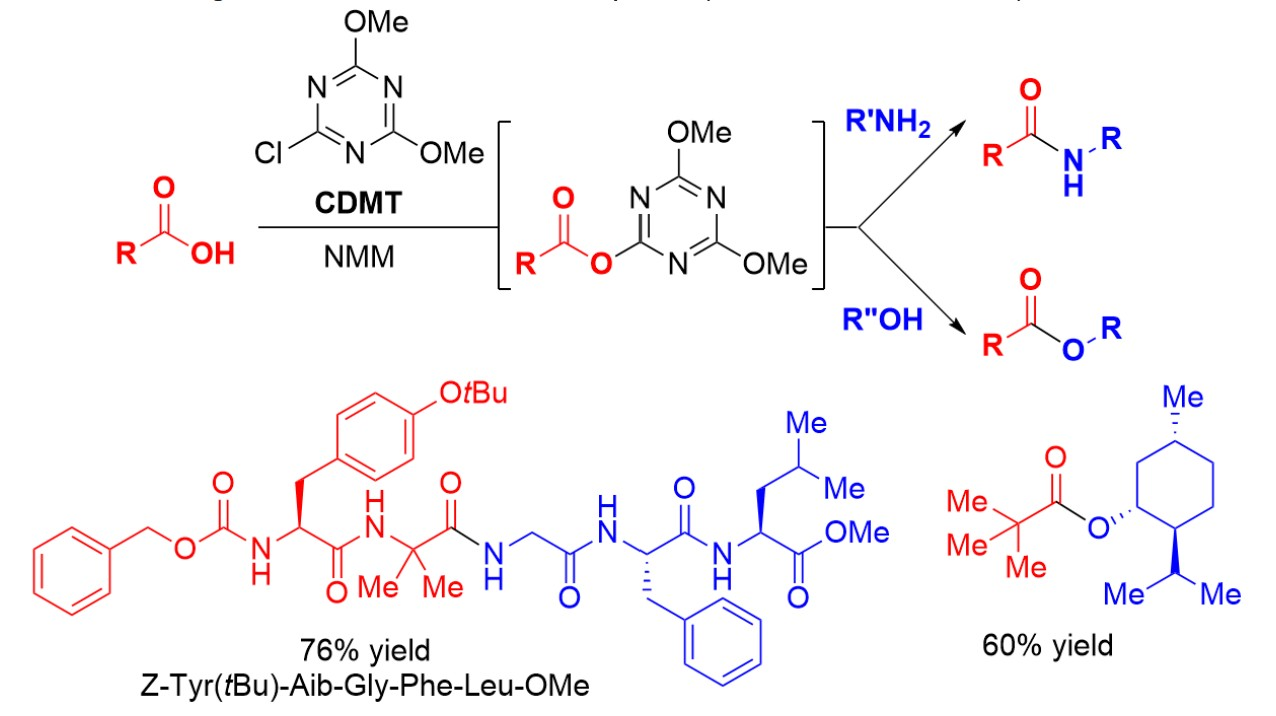

CDMT has been used to activate alcohols, transforming them into electrophiles for a variety of transformations. It has been used in glycosylations. The anomeric position can be activated selectively without protecting the other hydroxy groups. The isolated CDMT-adduct undergoes stereoselective reaction with alcohols when used as solvent in the presence of catalytic [CuI(CH_{3}CN)_{4}]PF_{6}. Isolated CDMT-adducts have also been used as electrophiles in nickel-catalyzed Suzuki-Miyaura cross couplings.

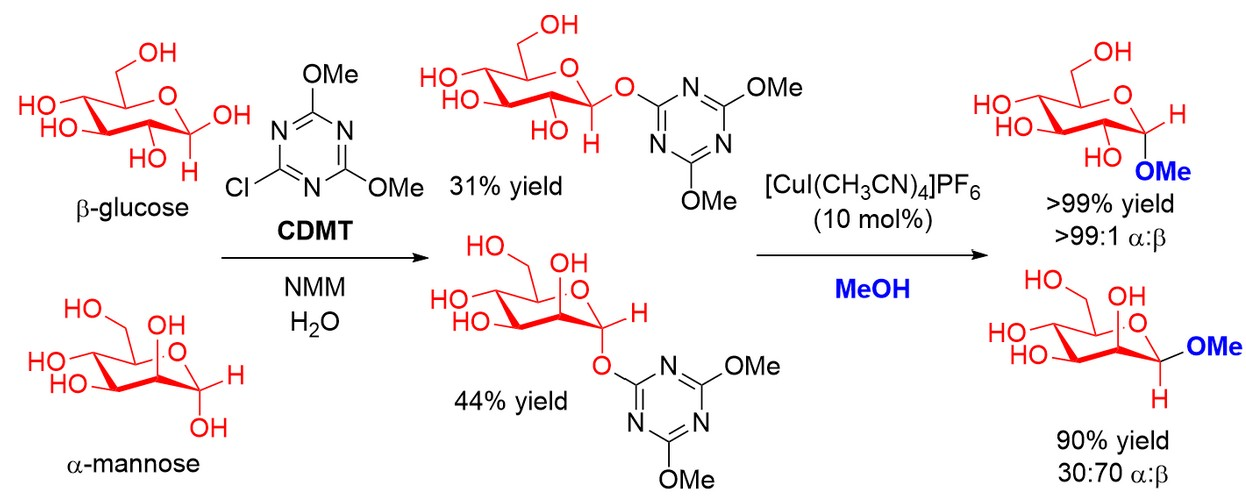

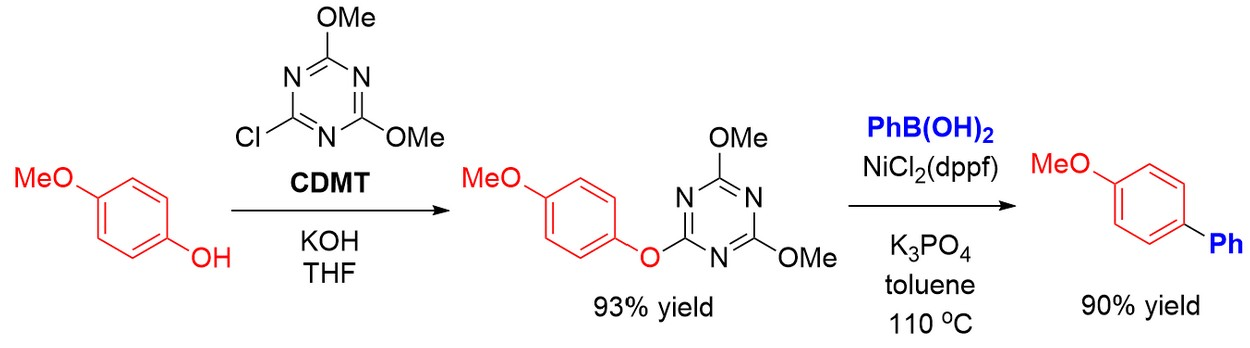

== Safety ==
In vivo dermal sensitization studies according to OECD 429 confirmed CMDT is a strong skin sensitizer, showing a response at 0.03 wt% in the local lymph node assay (LLNA) placing it in Globally Harmonized System of Classification and Labelling of Chemicals (GHS) Dermal Sensitization Category 1A. These studies confirm that DMTMM is a less sensitizing alternative to CDMT, as suggested by anecdotal observations in the literature.
