= Hexamethylcyclotrisilazane =

hexamethylcyclotrisilazane
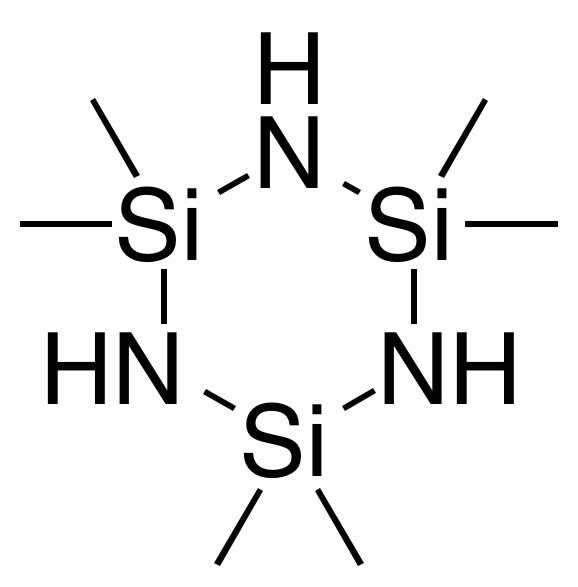

Names
- Preferred IUPAC name 2,2,4,4,6,6-hexamethyl-1,3,5,2,4,6-triazatrisilinane
- Other names 1,1,3,3,5,5-Hexamethyl-2,4,6,1,3,5-triazatrisilinane; 2,4,4,6,6-Hexamethyl-1,3,5-triaza-2,4,6-trisilacyclohexane; Dimethylsilazane trimer; HMCTS; HCMTSZ

Identifiers
CAS Number	1009-93-4
3D model (JSmol)	Interactive image
ChEMBL	ChEMBL3183025
ChemSpider	59483
ECHA InfoCard	100.012.521
EC Number	213-773-6
PubChem CID	66094
UNII	ECL2W6GI8L
CompTox Dashboard (EPA)	DTXSID4037748
- InChI: InChI=1/C6H21N3Si3/c1-8-10-7-11(3,4)9(2)12(8,5)6/h7H,10H2,1-6H3
- SMILES: C[Si]1(N[Si](N[Si](N1)(C)C)(C)C)C

Properties
Chemical formula	C_{6}H_{21}N_{3}Si_{3}
Molar mass	219.510 g·mol^{−1}
Density	d^{20} 0.9196 g/mL
Melting point	−10 °C
Boiling point	188 °C
Refractive index (n_{D})	n^{20}/D 1.445

Hazards
- GHS labelling
Pictograms	(GHS02: Flammable) (GHS05: Corrosive) (GHS07: Exclamation mark)
Signal word	Danger
Hazard statements	H226, H302, H314, H315, H319, H335
Precautionary statements	P210, P233, P240, P241, P242, P243, P260, P264, P270, P271, P280, P301+P312, P301+P330+P331, P302+P352, P303+P361+P353, P304+P340, P305+P351+P338, P310, P312, P321, P330, P332+P313, P337+P313, P362, P363, P370+P378, P403+P233, P403+P235, P405, P501
Flash point	59 °C; 139 °F; 333 K
- Lethal dose or concentration (LD, LC)
LD_{50} (median dose)	500 mg/kg (rat)
- Except where otherwise noted, data are given for materials in their standard state (at 25 °C [77 °F], 100 kPa). Infobox references

Hexamethylcyclotrisilazane is a chemical compound with formula C_{6}H_{21}N_{3}Si_{3} or [–Si(CH_{3})_{2}–NH–]_{3}. Its molecule consists of a six-member ring of three silicon atoms alternating with three nitrogen atoms, with two methyl groups bonded to each silicon and one hydrogen atom bonded to each nitrogen. It can be described as a derivative of the hypothetical compound cyclotrisilazane [–SiH_{2}–NH–]_{3}, or as a cyclic trimer of hypothetical dimethylsilazane (CH_{3})_{2}SiNH.

The compound is a clear colorless liquid at room temperature.

The compound has been extensively studied because of its applications in the semiconductor industry, as a precursor for the deposition of fils of silicon nitride and silicon carbonitride and as an additive in photoresist formulations. It has also been proposed as an additive to silica for liquid chromatography.

Other names for the compound are 2,2,4,4,6,6-hexamethyl-1,3,5,2,4,6-triazatrisilinane (IUPAC), 1,1,3,3,5,5-hexamethyl-2,4,6,1,3,5-triazatrisilinane, and 2,4,4,6,6-hexamethyl-1,3,5-triaza-2,4,6-trisilacyclohexane. The name is often abbreviated HMCTS or HMCTSZN.

== Structure ==
The silicon-nitrogen ring is nearly planar. The interatomic distances are: Si-N = 1.728 Å, Si-C = 1.871 Å, C-H = 1.124 Å. The approximate bond angles are N-Si-N ≈ 108°, Si-N-Si ≈ 127°, C-Si-C ≈ 109°, H-C-H ≈ 112°.

== Synthesis ==
The compound was obtained in 1948 by Brewer and Haber by introducing dimethyldichlorosilane Si(CH_{3})_{2}Cl_{2} into liquid ammonia NH_{3}, and then extracting the precipitate with benzene. The reaction yields a mixture of compounds, chiefly the trimer and the tetramer octamethyltetrasilazane. The trimer can be separated from the other products by fractional distillation.

The yield can be improved by converting the tetramer, through reaction with hydrogen in the presence of suitable catalysts.

== See also ==
- 2,2,4,4,6,6-hexamethyl-1,3,5-trithiane
