= C3H5ClO =

The molecular formula C_{3}H_{5}ClO (molar mass: 92.52 g/mol, exact mass: 92.0029 u) may refer to:

- Chloroacetone, a colourless liquid with a pungent odour
- Epichlorohydrin, an organochlorine compound and an epoxide
