= Thioacetone =

Chemical compound

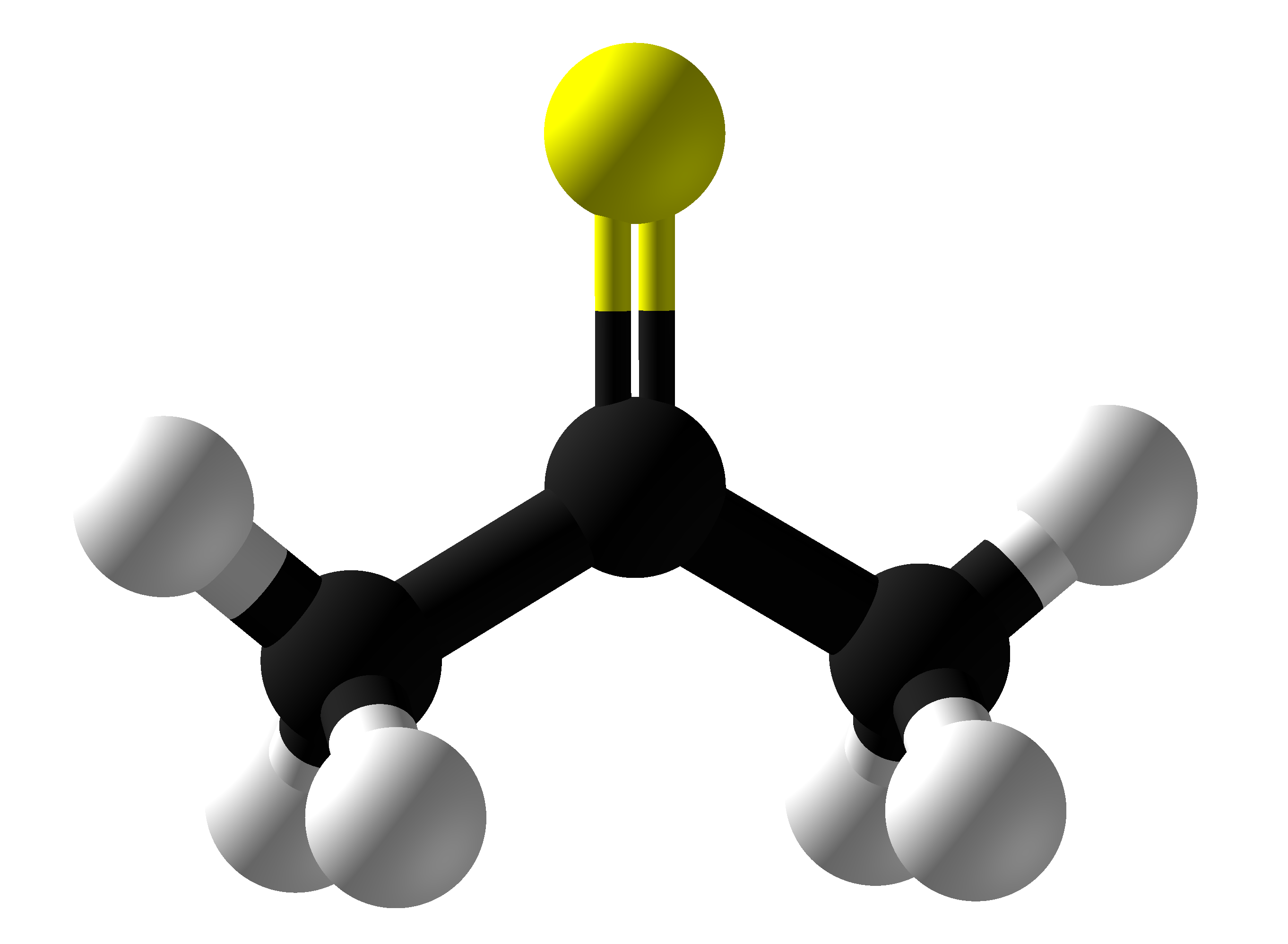

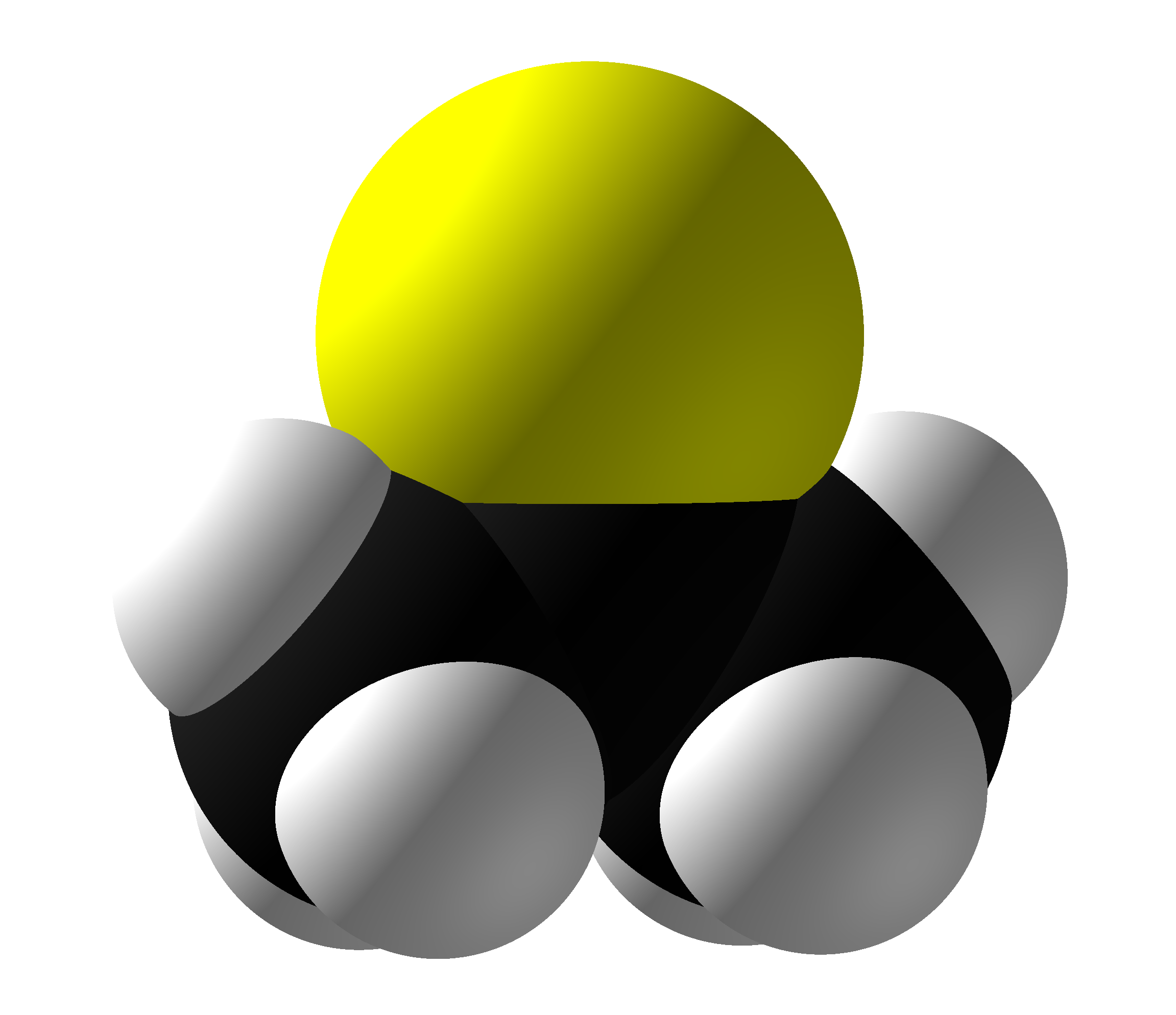

Names
- Preferred IUPAC name Propane-2-thione
- Systematic IUPAC name Thiopropan-2-one
- Other names: Propanethione; Thiopropanone; Thioacetone; Dimethyl thioketone; Sulfocarbon dimethanide; (Dimethyl)methylene sulfide; Sulfoacetone; Sulfopropanone

Identifiers
CAS Number	4756-05-2 monomer; 828-26-2 trimer
3D model (JSmol)	Interactive image
ChemSpider	557043
PubChem CID	641811
CompTox Dashboard (EPA)	DTXSID70963875
- InChI: InChI=1S/C3H6S/c1-3(2)4/h1-2H3 Key: JTNXQVCPQMQLHK-UHFFFAOYSA-N; InChI=1/C3H6S/c1-3(2)4/h1-2H3 Key: JTNXQVCPQMQLHK-UHFFFAOYAT
- SMILES: CC(=S)C

Properties
Chemical formula	C_{3}H_{6}S
Molar mass	74.14 g·mol^{−1}
Appearance	Orange to brown liquid
Odor	Extremely unpleasant; intensely sulfurous, leek-like
Melting point	−55°C(218.15k/-67°F)
Boiling point	70°C(343.15k/158°F)

Hazards
- Occupational safety and health (OHS/OSH)
Main hazards	Odor, skin irritant
- Except where otherwise noted, data are given for materials in their standard state (at 25 °C [77 °F], 100 kPa). Infobox references

Thioacetone is an organosulfur compound belonging to the ‑thione group called thioketones with a chemical formula (CH_{3})_{2}CS. It is an unstable orange or brown substance that can be isolated only at low temperatures. Above −20 °C (−4 °F), thioacetone readily converts to a polymer and a trimer, trithioacetone. It has an extremely potent, unpleasant odor, and is considered one of the worst-smelling substances known.

Thioacetone was first obtained in 1889 by Baumann and Fromm, as a minor impurity in their synthesis of trithioacetone.

== Preparation ==
Thioacetone is usually obtained by cracking the cyclic trimer trithioacetone, [(CH_{3})_{2}CS]_{3}. The trimer is prepared by pyrolysis of allyl isopropyl sulfide or by treating acetone with hydrogen sulfide in the presence of a Lewis acid. The trimer cracks at 500–600 °C (932–1,112 °F) to give the thione.

== Polymerization ==
Unlike its oxygen analogue acetone, which does not polymerise easily, thioacetone spontaneously polymerizes even at very low temperatures, pure or dissolved in ether or ethylene oxide, yielding a white solid that is a varying mixture of a linear polymer ···–[C(CH_{3})_{2}–S–]_{n}–··· and the cyclic trimer trithioacetone. Infrared absorption of this product occurs mainly at 2950, 2900, 1440, 1150, 1360, and 1375 cm^{−1} due to the geminal methyl pairs, and at 1085 and 643 cm^{−1} due to the C–S bond. The ^{1}H NMR spectrum shows a single peak at δ = 1.9 ppm.

The mean molecular weight of the polymer varies from 2000 to 14000 depending on the preparation method, temperature, and presence of the thioenol tautomer. The polymer melts in the range of about 70 °C to 125 °C. Polymerization is promoted by free radicals and light.

The cyclic trimer of thioacetone (trithioacetone) is a white or colorless compound with a melting point of 24 °C (75 °F), near room temperature. It also has a disagreeable odor.

== Odor ==
Thioacetone has an intensely foul odor. Like many low molecular weight organosulfur compounds, the smell is potent and can be detected even when highly diluted. In 1889, an attempt to distill the chemical in the German city of Freiburg was followed by cases of vomiting, nausea, and unconsciousness in an area with a radius of 0.75 kilometres (0.47 mi) around the laboratory due to the smell. In an 1890 report, British chemists at the Whitehall Soap Works in Leeds noted that dilution seemed to make the smell worse and described the smell as "fearful". In 1967, Esso researchers repeated the experiment of cracking trithioacetone at a laboratory south of Oxford, UK. They reported their experience as follows:

Recently we found ourselves with an odour problem beyond our worst expectations. During early experiments, a stopper jumped from a bottle of residues, and, although replaced at once, resulted in an immediate complaint of nausea and sickness from colleagues working in a building two hundred yards [180 m] away. Two of our chemists who had done no more than investigate the cracking of minute amounts of trithioacetone found themselves the object of hostile stares in a restaurant and suffered the humiliation of having a waitress spray the area around them with a deodorant. The odours defied the expected effects of dilution since workers in the laboratory did not find the odours intolerable ... and genuinely denied responsibility since they were working in closed systems. To convince them otherwise, they were dispersed with other observers around the laboratory, at distances up to a quarter of a mile [0.40 km], and one drop of either acetone gem-dithiol or the mother liquors from crude trithioacetone crystallisations were placed on a watch glass in a fume cupboard. The odour was detected downwind in seconds.

== See also ==
- Thiobenzophenone, a thioketone that can be isolated as a solid
- Bromoacetone
- Chloroacetone
- Fluoroacetone
- Iodoacetone
