= Cyanuric chloride =

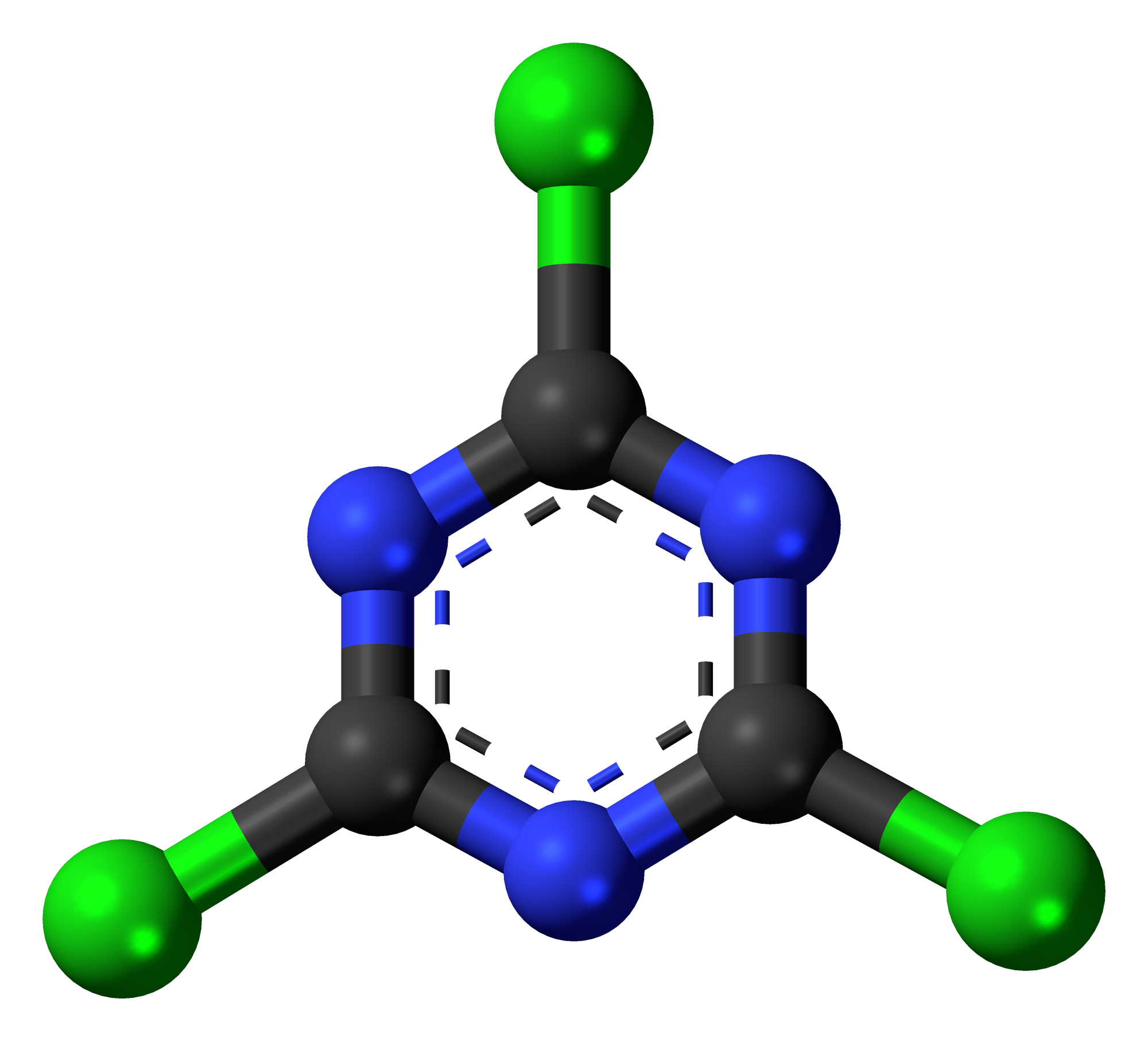

Names
- IUPAC name 2,4,6-Trichloro-1,3,5-triazine
- Other names Trichlorotriazine s-Triazine trichloride Cyanuryl chloride TCT

Identifiers
CAS Number	108-77-0
3D model (JSmol)	Interactive image
Beilstein Reference	124246
ChEBI	CHEBI:58964
ChEMBL	ChEMBL1530777
ChemSpider	7666
ECHA InfoCard	100.003.287
EC Number	203-614-9
PubChem CID	7954
RTECS number	XZ1400000
UNII	5U4L4QHD6I
UN number	2670
CompTox Dashboard (EPA)	DTXSID6026799
- InChI: InChI=1S/C3Cl3N3/c4-1-7-2(5)9-3(6)8-1 Key: MGNCLNQXLYJVJD-UHFFFAOYSA-N; InChI=1/C3Cl3N3/c4-1-7-2(5)9-3(6)8-1 Key: MGNCLNQXLYJVJD-UHFFFAOYAQ
- SMILES: Clc1nc(Cl)nc(Cl)n1

Properties
Chemical formula	C_{3}Cl_{3}N_{3}
Molar mass	184.40 g·mol^{−1}
Appearance	White powder
Odor	pungent
Density	1.32 g/cm^{3}
Melting point	144–148 °C (291–298 °F; 417–421 K)
Boiling point	192 °C (378 °F; 465 K)
Solubility in water	hydrolyzes
Solubility in organic solvents	soluble
Solubility in THF	0.34 g/mL
Solubility in CHCl3	0.17 g/mL

Structure
Crystal structure	monoclinic

Hazards
- GHS labelling
Pictograms	(GHS05: Corrosive) (GHS06: Toxic) (GHS07: Exclamation mark)
Signal word	Danger
Hazard statements	H302, H314, H317, H330
Precautionary statements	P260, P264, P270, P271, P272, P280, P284, P301+P312, P301+P330+P331, P302+P352, P303+P361+P353, P304+P340, P305+P351+P338, P310, P320, P321, P330, P333+P313, P363, P403+P233, P405, P501
NFPA 704 (fire diamond)	3 0 1 W
Flash point	Non-flammable
- Lethal dose or concentration (LD, LC)
LD_{50} (median dose)	485 mg/kg (rat, oral)
Safety data sheet (SDS)	ICSC 1231

Related compounds
Related triazines	Cyanuric acid Cyanuric fluoride Cyanuric bromide Trichloroisocyanuric acid
- Except where otherwise noted, data are given for materials in their standard state (at 25 °C [77 °F], 100 kPa). verify (what is ?) Infobox references

Cyanuric chloride is an organic compound with the formula (NCCl)_{3}. This white solid is the chlorinated derivative of 1,3,5-triazine. It is the trimer of cyanogen chloride. Cyanuric chloride is the main precursor to the popular but controversial herbicide atrazine.

== Production ==
Cyanuric chloride is prepared in two steps from hydrogen cyanide via the intermediacy of cyanogen chloride, which is trimerized at elevated temperatures over a carbon catalyst:

HCN + Cl_{2} → ClCN + HCl

In 2005, approximately 200,000 tons were produced.

== Industrial uses ==
It is estimated that 70% of cyanuric chloride is used in the preparation of the triazine-class herbicides, especially atrazine. Such reactions rely on the easy displacement of the chloride with nucleophiles such as amines:

(ClCN)_{3} + 2 RNH_{2} → (RNHCN)(ClCN)_{2} + RNH_{3}^{+}Cl^{−}

Other triazine herbicides, such as simazine, anilazine and cyromazine are made in an analogous way.

Cyanuric chloride is also used as a precursor to dyes and crosslinking agents. The largest class of these dyes are the sulfonated triazine-stilbene optical brighteners (OBA) or fluorescent whitening agents (FWA) commonly found in detergent formulas and white paper. Many reactive dyes also incorporate a triazine ring. They are also manufactured by way of the chloride displacement reaction shown above.

== Reactivity ==
The chloride centers are easily replaced. Amines give melamine derivatives, for example in the synthesis of dendrimers:

(ClCN)_{3} + R_{2}NH → (R_{2}NCN)_{3} + 3 HCl

It reacts with hydrosulfide to give thiocyanuric acid ((S=CNH)_{3}).

=== Organic synthesis ===
Cyanuric chloride is employed as a reagent in organic synthesis for the conversion of alcohols into alkyl chlorides, and carboxylic acids into acyl chlorides. Cyanuric chloride is also the starting material for synthesis of the reagents CDMT and DMTMM, which exhibit similar reactivity to cyanuric chloride.

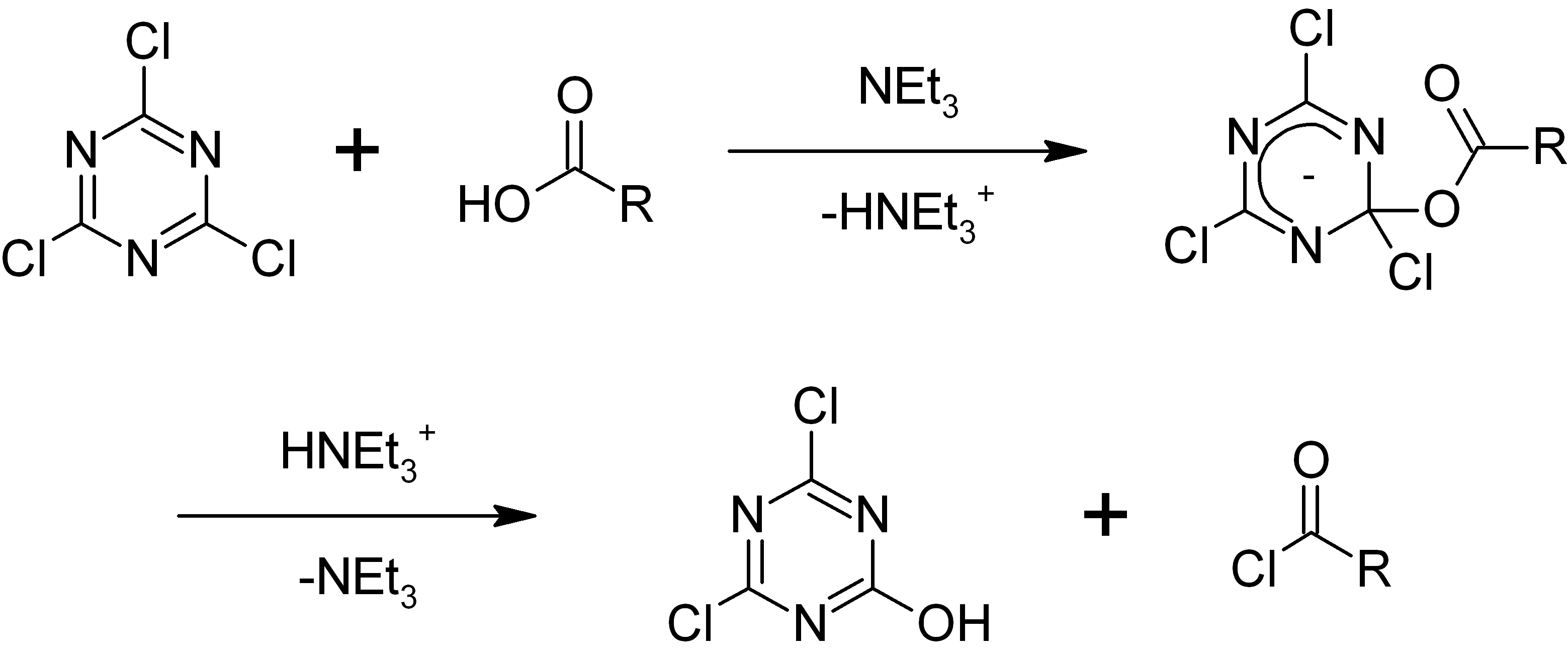

It is also used as a dehydrating agent, e.g. in the conversion of amides to nitriles, and for the activation of carboxylic acids for reduction to alcohols. Heating with DMF gives "Gold's reagent" Me_{2}NCH=NCH=NMe_{2}^{+}Cl^{−}, which is a versatile source of aminoalkylations and a precursor to heterocycles.

Cyanuric chloride can also be used as an alternative to oxalyl chloride in the Swern oxidation.

== See also ==
- Thiazyl chloride trimer – structural analogue with sulfur atoms in-place of carbon
