= Polysaccharide–protein conjugate =

Synthetic methods and Applications of Polysaccharide–protein Conjugate

Polysaccharide–protein conjugates may have better solubility and stability, reduced immunogenicity, prolonged circulation time, and enhanced targeting ability compared to native protein. They are promising alternatives to PEG–protein drugs, in which non-biodegradable high molecular weight PEG causes health concerns.

== Synthetic methods ==
Reductive amination, the Maillard reaction, EDC/NHS coupling, DMTMM coupling, disulfide bond formation, and click chemistry are common methods to synthesize polysaccharide–protein conjugates.

== Applications ==
Polysaccharide–protein conjugates are used for food industry, vaccines, and drug delivery systems.
