= 1,3,5-Trithiane =

Chemical compound

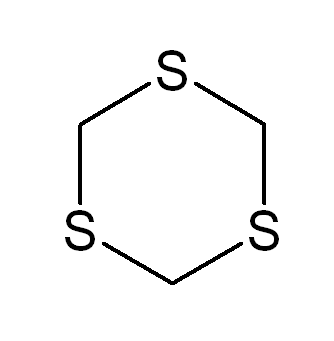

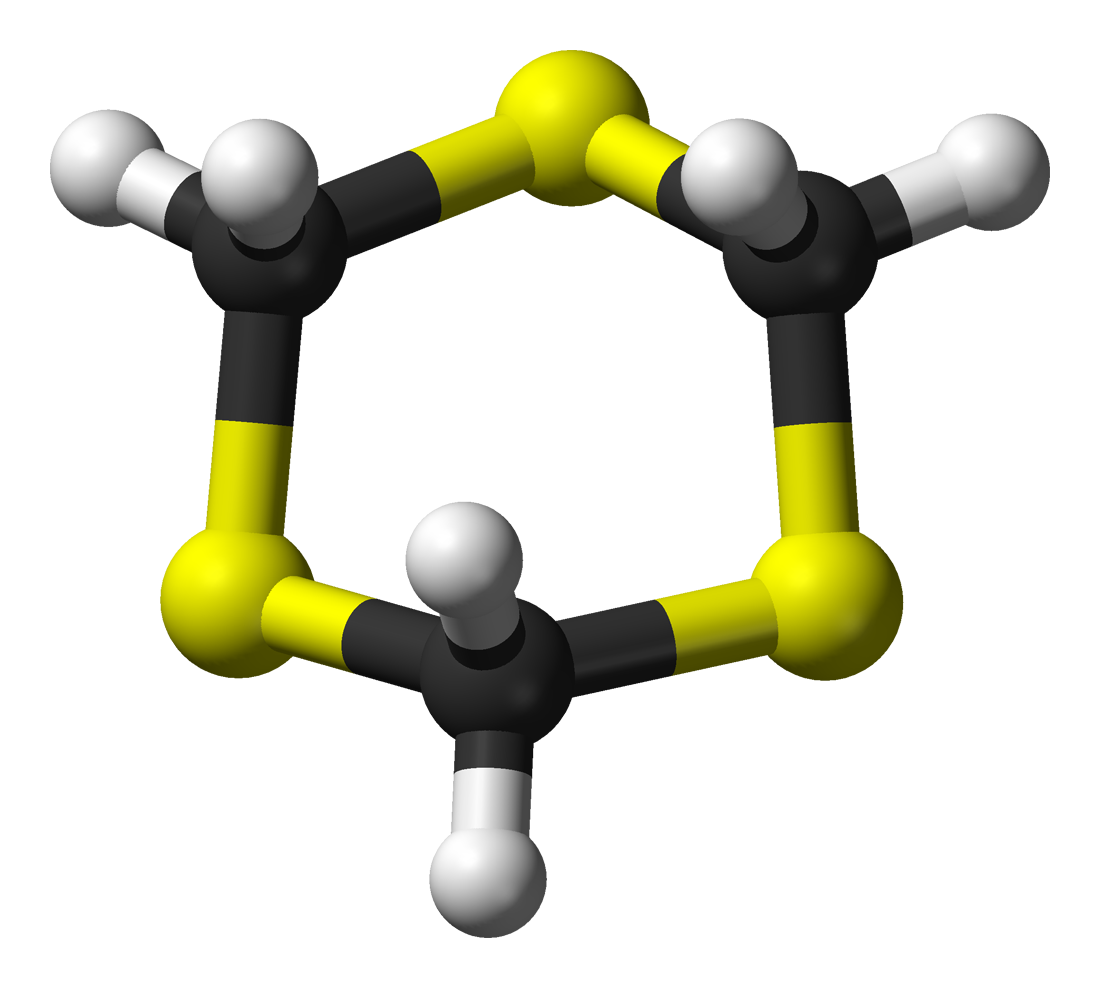

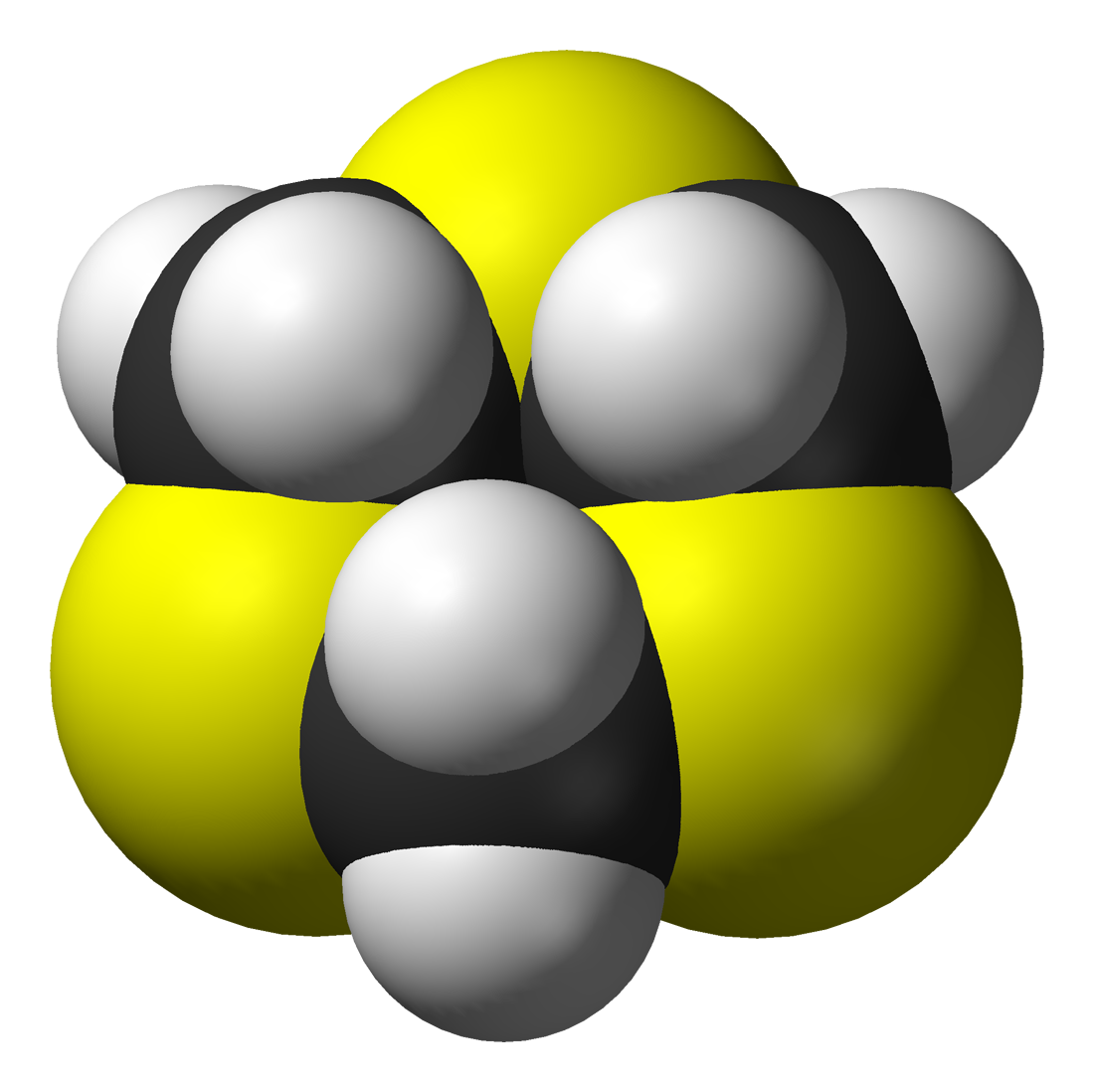

Names
- Preferred IUPAC name 1,3,5-Trithiane
- Other names Thioformaldehyde trimer, Trimethylentrisulfide, Trimethylene trisulfide, Trithioformaldehyde, 1,3,5-Trithiacyclohexane, sym-Trithiane, Thioform, s-Trithiane

Identifiers
CAS Number	291-21-4
3D model (JSmol)	Interactive image
ChEBI	CHEBI:39196
ChemSpider	8907
ECHA InfoCard	100.005.482
EC Number	206-029-7
PubChem CID	9264
UNII	4AM764YC6X
CompTox Dashboard (EPA)	DTXSID2059778
- InChI: InChI=1S/C3H6S3/c1-4-2-6-3-5-1/h1-3H2 Key: LORRLQMLLQLPSJ-UHFFFAOYSA-N; InChI=1/C3H6S3/c1-4-2-6-3-5-1/h1-3H2 Key: LORRLQMLLQLPSJ-UHFFFAOYAA
- SMILES: S1CSCSC1

Properties
Chemical formula	C_{3}H_{6}S_{3}
Molar mass	138.27
Appearance	Colourless solid
Density	1.6374 g/cm^{3}
Melting point	215 to 220 °C (419 to 428 °F; 488 to 493 K)
Solubility in water	Slightly soluble
Solubility	Benzene

Hazards
- Occupational safety and health (OHS/OSH)
Main hazards	Toxic (T)
- GHS labelling
Pictograms	(GHS07: Exclamation mark)
Signal word	Warning
Hazard statements	H319
Precautionary statements	P264, P280, P305+P351+P338, P313
NFPA 704 (fire diamond)	1 1 0
- Except where otherwise noted, data are given for materials in their standard state (at 25 °C [77 °F], 100 kPa). verify (what is ?) Infobox references

1,3,5-Trithiane is the chemical compound with the formula (CH_{2}S)_{3}. This heterocycle is the cyclic trimer of the otherwise unstable species thioformaldehyde. It consists of a six-membered ring with alternating methylene bridges and thioether groups. It is prepared by treatment of formaldehyde with hydrogen sulfide.

Trithiane is a building block molecule in organic synthesis, being a masked source of formaldehyde. In one application, it is deprotonated with organolithium reagents to give the lithium derivative, which can be alkylated.

(CH_{2}S)_{3} + RLi → (CH_{2}S)_{2}(CHLiS) + RH
(CH_{2}S)_{2}(CHLiS) + R′Br → (CH_{2}S)_{2}(CHR′S) + LiBr
(CH_{2}S)_{2}(CHR′S) + H_{2}O → R′CHO + ....

Trithiane is the dithioacetal of formaldehyde. Other dithioacetals undergo similar reactions to the above.

It is also a precursor to other organosulfur reagents. For example, chlorination in the presence of water affords the chloromethyl sulfonyl chloride:

(CH_{2}S)_{3} + 9 Cl_{2} + 6 H_{2}O → 3 ClCH_{2}SO_{2}Cl + 12 HCl

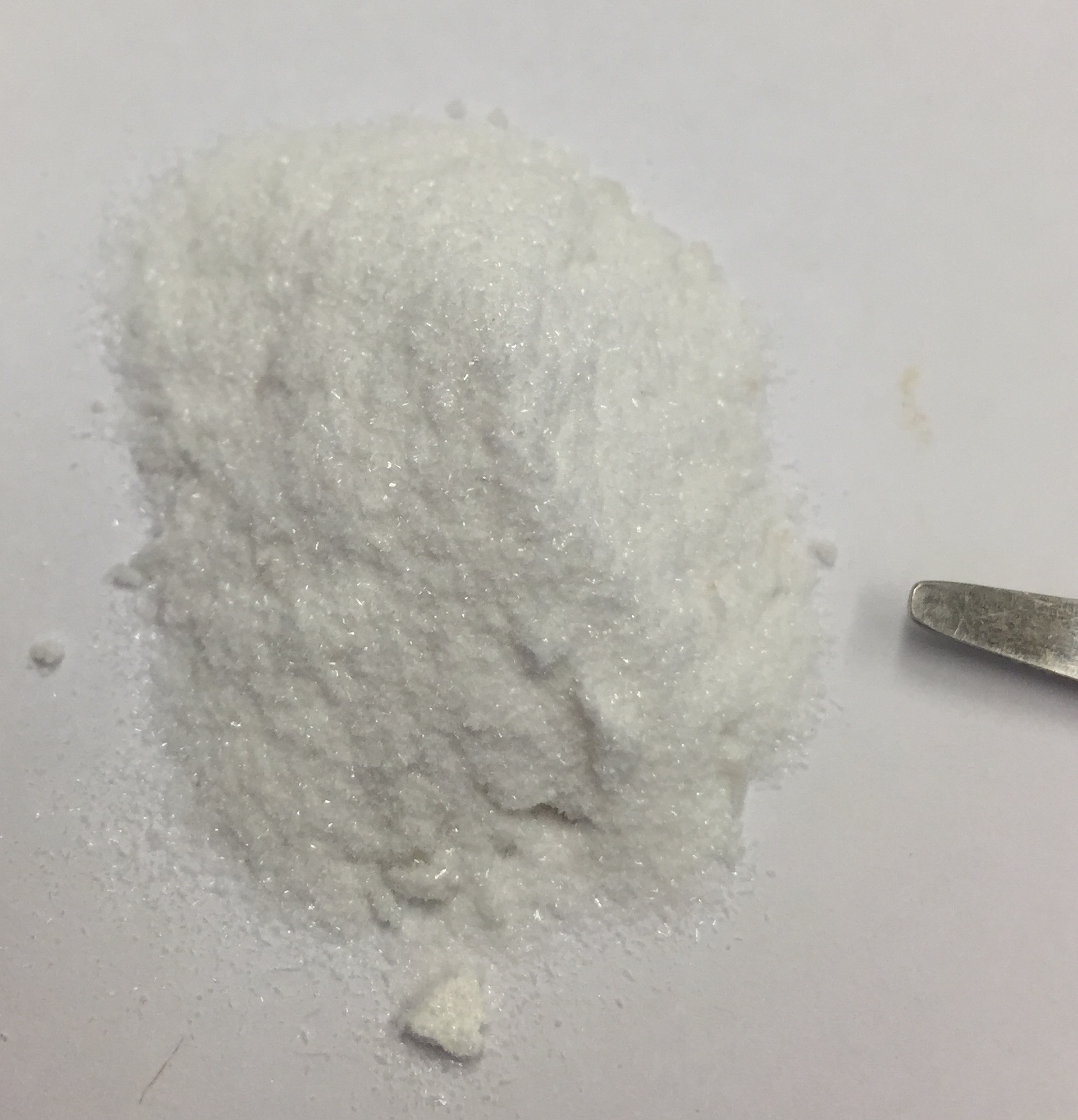
Sample of sym-trithiane.

== Trithianes ==
Trithiane is the parent of a class of heterocycles called trithianes, that formally result from substitution of various monovalent groups for one or more of the hydrogen atoms. The species often arise from thiation of ketones and aldehydes. The incipient thioketones and thioaldehydes undergo trimerization. One example is 2,2,4,4,6,6-hexamethyl-1,3,5-trithiane, or trithioacetone, the trimer of thioacetone (propane-2-thione). Alternatively 1,3,5-trithiane can be deprotonated and alkylated to afford (SCH_{2})_{n}(SCHR)_{3-n}.

The conformation of trithianes has been well investigated.
