= Fluoroacetone =

Names
- IUPAC name 1-Fluoropropan-2-one
- Other names Fluoroacetone; 1-fluoro-2-propanone

Identifiers
CAS Number	430-51-3
3D model (JSmol)	Interactive image
ChemSpider	21171516
ECHA InfoCard	100.006.423
EC Number	207-064-0
PubChem CID	9889
UNII	735L3MV2UG
CompTox Dashboard (EPA)	DTXSID70195619
- InChI: InChI=1S/C3H5FO/c1-3(5)2-4/h2H2,1H3 Key: MSWVMWGCNZQPIA-UHFFFAOYSA-N
- SMILES: CC(=O)CF

Properties
Chemical formula	C_{3}H_{5}FO
Molar mass	76.070 g·mol^{−1}
Appearance	colorless liquid
Density	1.054 g/mL
Boiling point	75 °C (167 °F; 348 K)

Hazards
- GHS labelling
Pictograms	(GHS02: Flammable) (GHS06: Toxic)
Signal word	Danger
Hazard statements	H225, H300, H310, H330
Precautionary statements	P210, P233, P240, P241, P242, P243, P260, P262, P264, P270, P271, P280, P284, P301+P310, P302+P350, P303+P361+P353, P304+P340, P310, P320, P321, P330, P361, P363, P370+P378, P403+P233, P403+P235, P405, P501
NFPA 704 (fire diamond)	4 3 0
Flash point	7 °C (45 °F; 280 K)
- Except where otherwise noted, data are given for materials in their standard state (at 25 °C [77 °F], 100 kPa). Infobox references

Fluoroacetone is an organofluorine compound with the chemical formula C_{3}H_{5}FO. Under normal conditions, it is a clear colorless liquid. Fluoroacetone is known for its highly toxic and flammable nature. Fumes of fluoroacetone can form an explosive mixture with air, which makes it extremely hazardous.

Fluoroacetone is mainly applied in research and industrial chemistry environments. It is known for being used as a catalyst to study the kinetics of ketone-catalysed reactions. It also serves a purpose for synthesizing higher fluoroketones, which has specialized applications in the pharmaceutical industry.

== Structure and reactivity ==
The structure is made up of an acetone group with a fluorine atom attached at one end of the carbon chain. The fluorine atom strongly changes the reactivity in comparison to the normal acetone molecule. This is caused by that fluorine strongly pulls electrons and that makes the carbonyl group in the compound more electrophilic and reactive. Some of the main reactions this compound can induce are nucleophilic addition, aldol reactions, alkylation, hydration and redox reactions. For example, fluoroacteone can be reduced to an alcohol through a nucleophilic addition using sodium borohydride. With the use of a base, fluoroacetone can build larger fluorinated molecules like ketones through aldol reactions.

Fluoroacetone has a low boiling point (75 °C), so it can mix with air when vaporized. When this vapor is exposed to heat or fire it can cause an explosive combustion reaction.

== Synthesis ==
The most common route to synthesize fluoroacetone is through a reaction of triethylamine tris-hydrofluoride with bromoacetone. This is done through nucleophilic halogen exchange. The bromide in bromoacetone gets replaced by the fluorine in triethylamine tris-hydrofluoride.

== Toxicity ==
Fluoroacetone is toxic through all routes of exposure, including ingestion, skin absorption and inhalation. It significantly affects the kidneys, heart, and liver. The main effects reported are neurological, cardiovascular and respiratory effects, and gastrointestinal symptoms and metabolic disturbances can also appear. Fluoroacetone is also irritating to the skin, eyes and respiratory tract.

Fluoroacetone is toxic because it is metabolized through a process called lethal synthesis, which is the process of the body converting a molecule into a more toxic metabolite. In this case, fluoroacetone is first transformed into fluoroacetaldehyde and then into fluoroacetate through oxidation in the liver. The enzymes involved in this are alcohol dehydrogenases and aldehyde dehydrogenases. The fluoroacetate is activated by acetyl-CoA synthetase forming fluoroacetyl-CoA. This metabolic intermediate can then enter the citric acid cycle by mimicking acetyl-CoA. In the citric acid cycle, fluorocitrate is formed instead of citrate, which is normally formed. Fluorocitrate inhibits the enzyme aconitase and causes the citric cycle to be blocked.

Lethal doses have been estimated based on animal studies and related fluorinated ketones and are approximately:
• Rat: 2-10 mg/kg
• Mouse: 50-200 mg/kg
• Rabbit: 100-300 mg/kg

== See also ==
- Bromoacetone
- Chloroacetone
- Iodoacetone
- Thioacetone
