= Bis(chloromethyl) ketone =

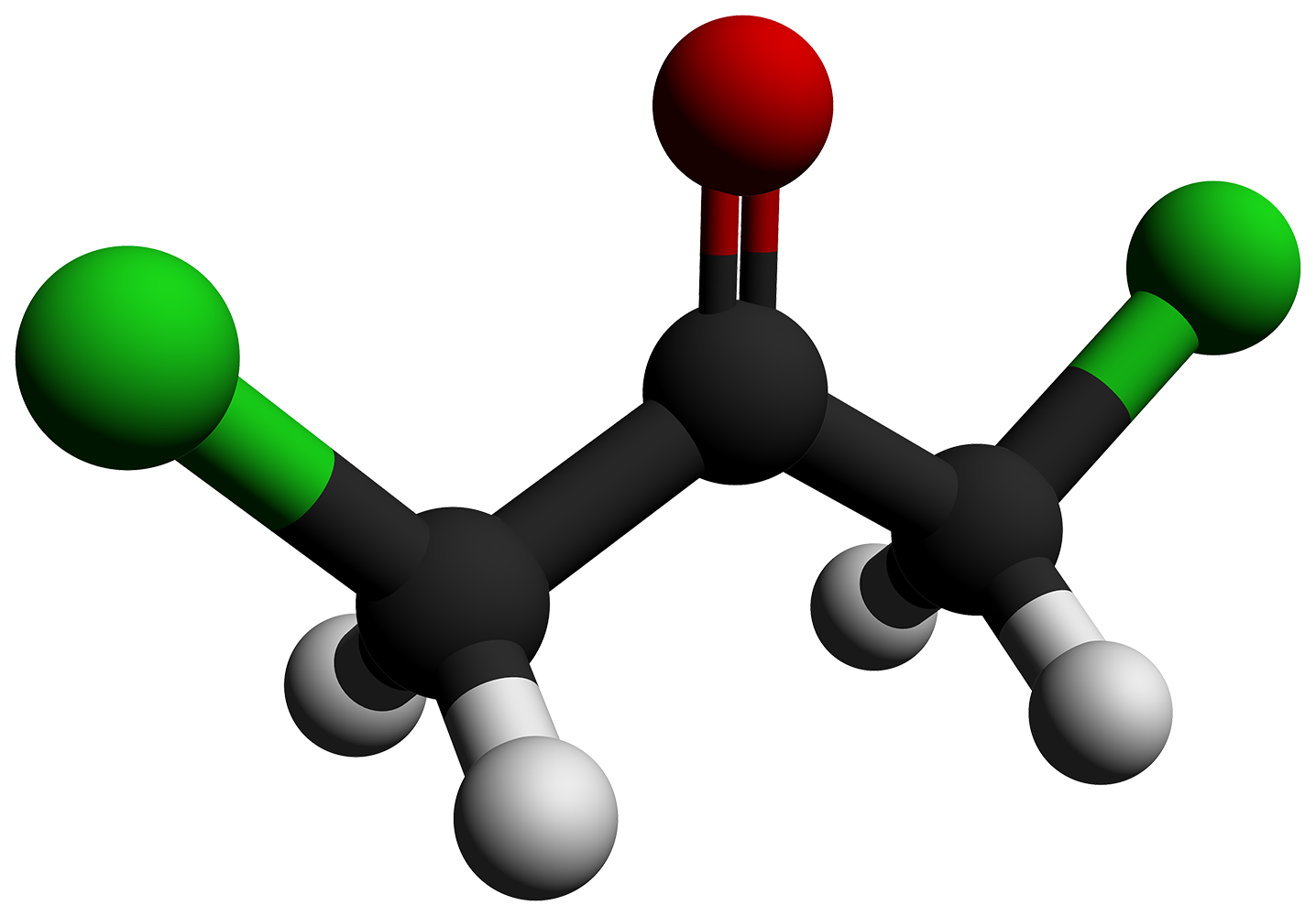

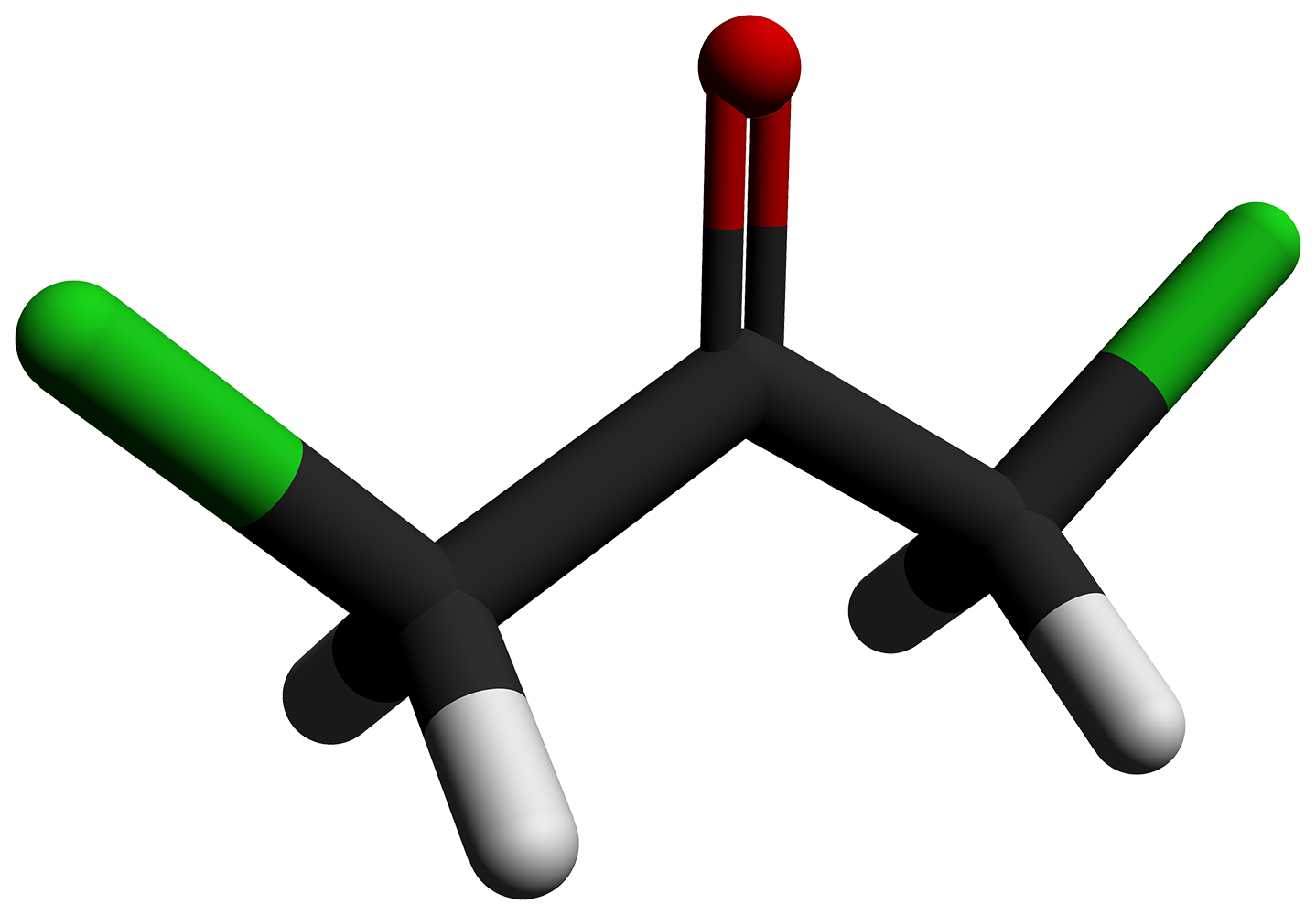

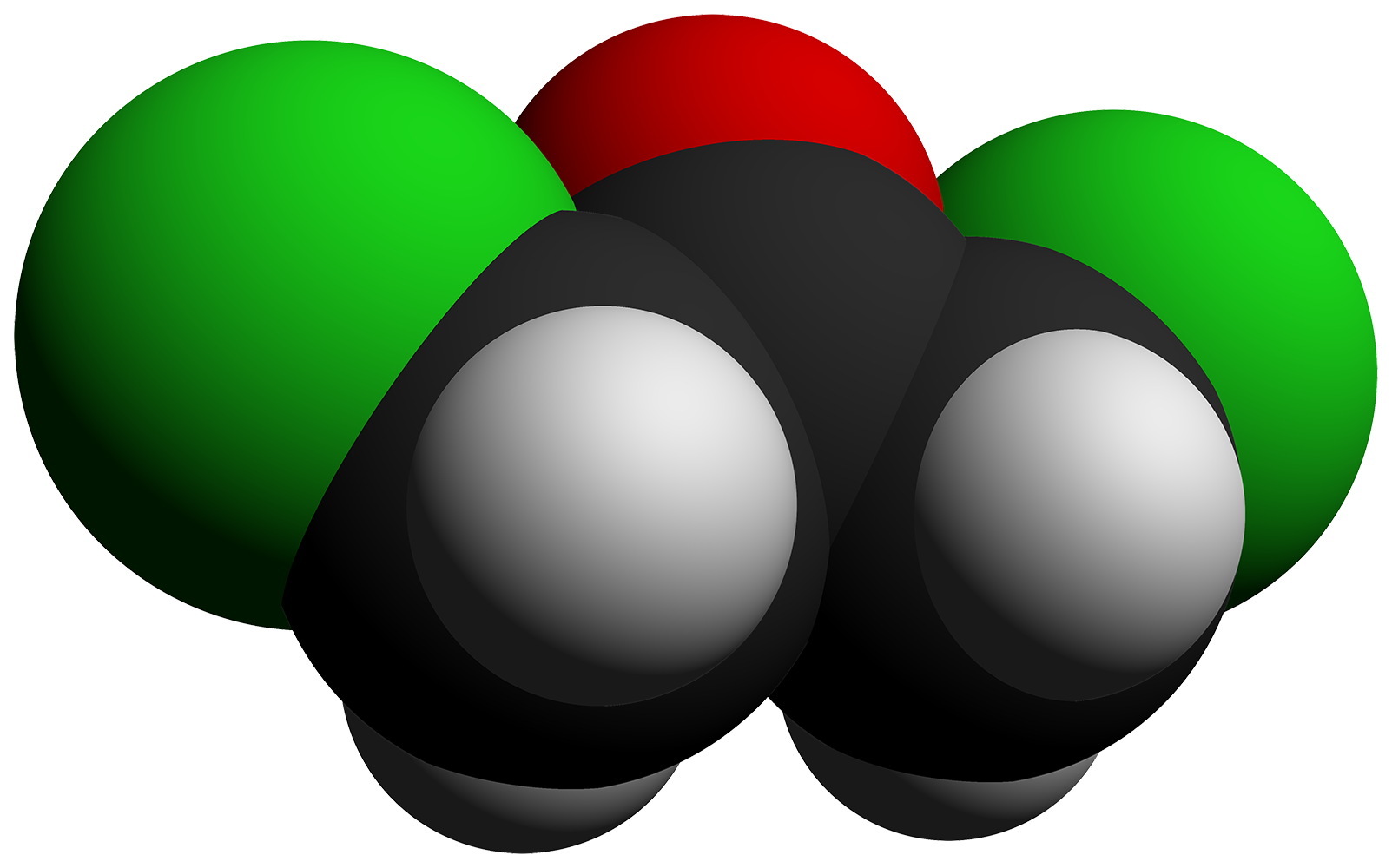

Names
- Preferred IUPAC name 1,3-Dichloropropan-2-one
- Other names 1,3-Dichloroacetone α,α'-Dichloroacetone; 1,3-Dichloropropanone

Identifiers
CAS Number	534-07-6
3D model (JSmol)	Interactive image
ChEMBL	ChEMBL1231783
ChemSpider	21106513
ECHA InfoCard	100.007.806
EC Number	208-585-6
PubChem CID	10793
UNII	UFH8559WS5
UN number	2649
CompTox Dashboard (EPA)	DTXSID2021577
- InChI: InChI=1S/C3H4Cl2O/c4-1-3(6)2-5/h1-2H2 Key: SUNMBRGCANLOEG-UHFFFAOYSA-N; InChI=1/C3H4Cl2O/c4-1-3(6)2-5/h1-2H2 Key: SUNMBRGCANLOEG-UHFFFAOYAE
- SMILES: ClCC(=O)CCl

Properties
Chemical formula	C_{3}H_{4}Cl_{2}O
Molar mass	126.96 g·mol^{−1}
Melting point	45 °C (113 °F; 318 K)
Boiling point	173.4 °C (344.1 °F; 446.5 K)
Acidity (pK_{a})	12.88 (H_{2}O)

Hazards
- Occupational safety and health (OHS/OSH)
Main hazards	Extremely toxic. Dangerous to the skin and eyes
- GHS labelling
Pictograms	(GHS05: Corrosive) (GHS06: Toxic) (GHS08: Health hazard) (GHS09: Environmental hazard)
Signal word	Danger
Hazard statements	H300, H310, H314, H330, H341, H410
Precautionary statements	P201, P202, P260, P262, P264, P270, P271, P273, P280, P281, P284, P301+P310, P301+P330+P331, P302+P350, P303+P361+P353, P304+P340, P305+P351+P338, P308+P313, P310, P320, P321, P330, P361, P363, P391, P403+P233, P405, P501
NFPA 704 (fire diamond)	4 1 0
- Except where otherwise noted, data are given for materials in their standard state (at 25 °C [77 °F], 100 kPa). Infobox references

Bis(chloromethyl) ketone is a chemical substance with formula C_{3}H_{4}Cl_{2}O. It is a dangerous solid.

== Legal aspects ==
Exposures such as contact or inhalation of bis(chloromethyl) ketone can result in irritation or damage to skin, eyes, throat, lungs, liver and kidneys, as well as headaches and fainting.

Consequently, bis(chloromethyl) ketone is classified as an extremely hazardous substance in the United States as defined in Section 302 of the U.S. Emergency Planning and Community Right-to-Know Act (42 U.S.C. 11002), and is subject to strict reporting requirements by facilities which produce, store, or use it in significant quantities.

== Applications ==
As both chlorine atoms tend to react at the same time, the compound is primarily useful for synthesis of various ring compounds. Some of the known uses of 1,3-dichloropropanone include in the synthesis mubritinib, dipraglurant, oxathiapiprolin, Fluconazole, UK-47265, watermelon ketones Cascalone & Aldolone & Transluzone & Azurone & Conoline.

In principle, it can be used to manufacture citric acid.

== See also ==
- Chloroacetone
- Hexachloroacetone
