= Thiocyanuric acid =

Identifiers
CAS Number	638-16-4
3D model (JSmol)	Interactive image
ChEMBL	ChEMBL3306346
ChemSpider	1064800
ECHA InfoCard	100.010.294
EC Number	211-322-8
PubChem CID	1268121
UNII	KX0WZE0QAQ
CompTox Dashboard (EPA)	DTXSID3045067
- InChI: InChI=1S/C3H3N3S3/c7-1-4-2(8)6-3(9)5-1/h(H3,4,5,6,7,8,9) Key: WZRRRFSJFQTGGB-UHFFFAOYSA-N
- SMILES: C1(=S)NC(=S)NC(=S)N1

Properties
Chemical formula	C_{3}H_{3}N_{3}S_{3}
Molar mass	177.26 g·mol^{−1}
Appearance	yellow solid
Density	1.35 g/cm^{3}
Melting point	290 °C (554 °F; 563 K)

Hazards
- GHS labelling
Pictograms	(GHS07: Exclamation mark)
Signal word	Warning
Hazard statements	H302
Precautionary statements	P261, P264, P264+P265, P270, P271, P280, P301+P317, P302+P352, P304+P340, P305+P351+P338, P319, P321, P330, P332+P317, P337+P317, P362+P364, P403+P233, P405, P501
- Except where otherwise noted, data are given for materials in their standard state (at 25 °C [77 °F], 100 kPa). Infobox references

Thiocyanuric acid is the organosulfur compound with the formula (HNC=S)_{3}. It is analogous to cyanuric acid ((HNC=O)_{3}). Cyanuric acid is white whereas thiocyanuric acid is yellow. It can also be viewed as a trimeric thioamide.

== Structure ==
It is a planar molecular as determined by X-ray crystallography. Like cyanuric acid, thiocyanuric acid forms extended hydrogen-bonded network resulting in a sheet-like structure. This arrangement is relevant to the high melting point of the compound.

== Synthesis, reactions, applications ==
Thiocyanuric acid precipitates from warm, acidic solutions of thiocyanic acid. A modern synthesis begins instead with a preformed ring: cyanuric chloride reacts with sodium hydrosulfide to give table salt and thiocyanuric acid.

The compound is mildly acidic, with pKa's of 5.7, 8.4, and 11.4. Various salts of (HNC=S)^{−}_{3} have been characterized.

The compound has an affinity for heavy metals. This attribute has been exploited by applying thiocyanuric acid and derivatives to treatment of waste waters.
