= Iodoacetone =

Names
- Preferred IUPAC name 1-Iodopropan-2-one

Identifiers
CAS Number	3019-04-3
3D model (JSmol)	Interactive image
ChemSpider	68871
ECHA InfoCard	100.019.238
EC Number	221-161-5
PubChem CID	76396
UNII	T3Q5SQ2YLU
CompTox Dashboard (EPA)	DTXSID70184260
- InChI: InChI=1S/C3H5IO/c1-3(5)2-4/h2H2,1H3 Key: WEFSXBPMNKAUDL-UHFFFAOYSA-N
- SMILES: CC(=O)CI

Properties
Chemical formula	C_{3}H_{5}IO
Molar mass	183.976 g·mol^{−1}
Appearance	Yellow liquid
Density	2.0±0.1 g/cm^{3}
Boiling point	163.1 °C (325.6 °F; 436.2 K)
Vapor pressure	2.1±0.3 mmHg
- Except where otherwise noted, data are given for materials in their standard state (at 25 °C [77 °F], 100 kPa). Infobox references

Iodoacetone is an organoiodine compound with the chemical formula C_{3}H_{5}IO The substance is a colorless liquid under normal conditions, soluble in ethanol.

== Synthesis ==
The reaction of acetone and iodine produces iodoacetone. The reaction is typically acid catalysed and first order with respect to acetone and the acid catalyst:

C_{3}H_{6}O + I_{2} → HI + C_{3}H_{5}IO

== See also ==
- Bromoacetone
- Chloroacetone
- Fluoroacetone
- Thioacetone
