= Tribromoisocyanuric acid =

Names
- Preferred IUPAC name 1,3,5-Tribromo-1,3,5-triazinane-2,4,6-trione
- Other names TBCA; 1,3,5-tribromo-1,3,5-triazine-2,4,6(1H,3H,5H)-trione

Identifiers
CAS Number	17497-85-7
3D model (JSmol)	Interactive image
ChemSpider	8039637
PubChem CID	9863943
UNII	L8RKK5P98Z
CompTox Dashboard (EPA)	DTXSID60432060
- InChI: InChI=1S/C3Br3N3O3/c4-7-1(10)8(5)3(12)9(6)2(7)11 Key: ZKWDCFPLNQTHSH-UHFFFAOYSA-N
- SMILES: C1(=O)N(C(=O)N(C(=O)N1Br)Br)Br

Properties
Chemical formula	C_{3}Br_{3}N_{3}O_{3}
Molar mass	366 g/mol
Appearance	colourless solid
Boiling point	decomposes
Solubility in sulfuric acid	Soluble

Structure
Coordination geometry	planar
Dipole moment	0 D

Hazards
- Occupational safety and health (OHS/OSH)
Main hazards	lung irritant
Flash point	N/A

Related compounds
Related compounds	Cyanuric bromide Dibromoisocyanuric acid Trichloroisocyanuric acid
- Except where otherwise noted, data are given for materials in their standard state (at 25 °C [77 °F], 100 kPa). verify (what is ?) Infobox references

Tribromoisocyanuric acid (C_{3}Br_{3}N_{3}O_{3}) is a chemical compound used as a reagent for bromination in organic synthesis. It is a white crystalline powder with a strong bromine odour. It is similar to trichloroisocyanuric acid.

== Uses ==
Tribromoisocyanuric acid is used for the bromination of aromatics and alkenes.
