= Hexachloroacetone =

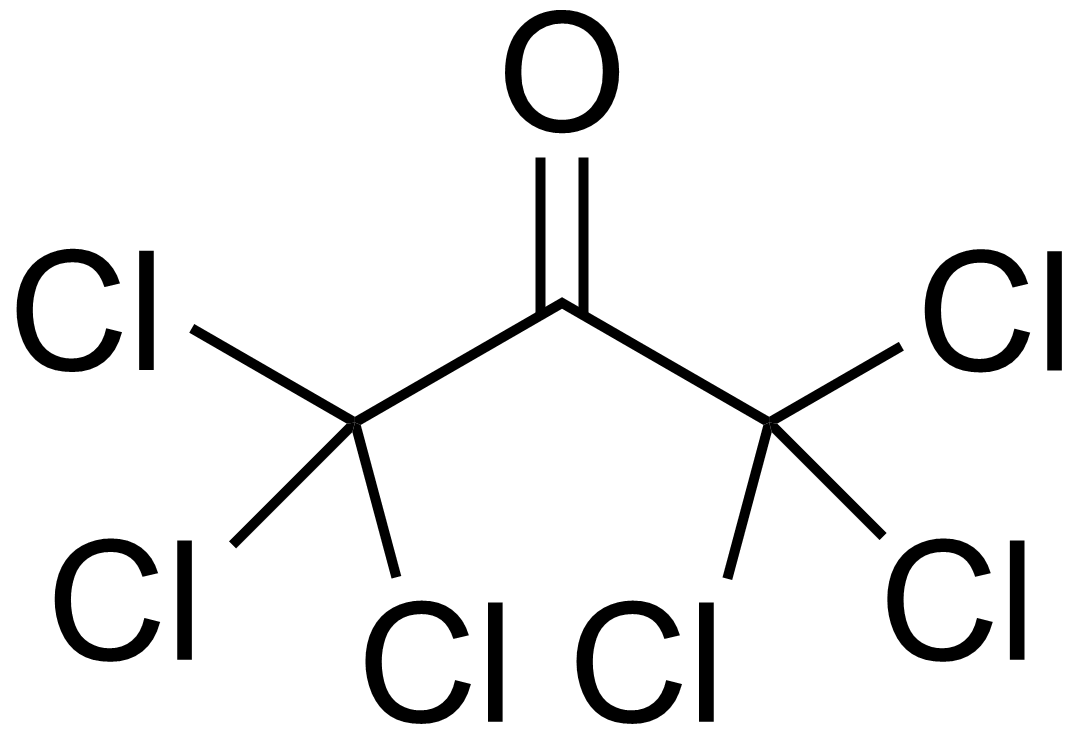
- Hexachloroacetone

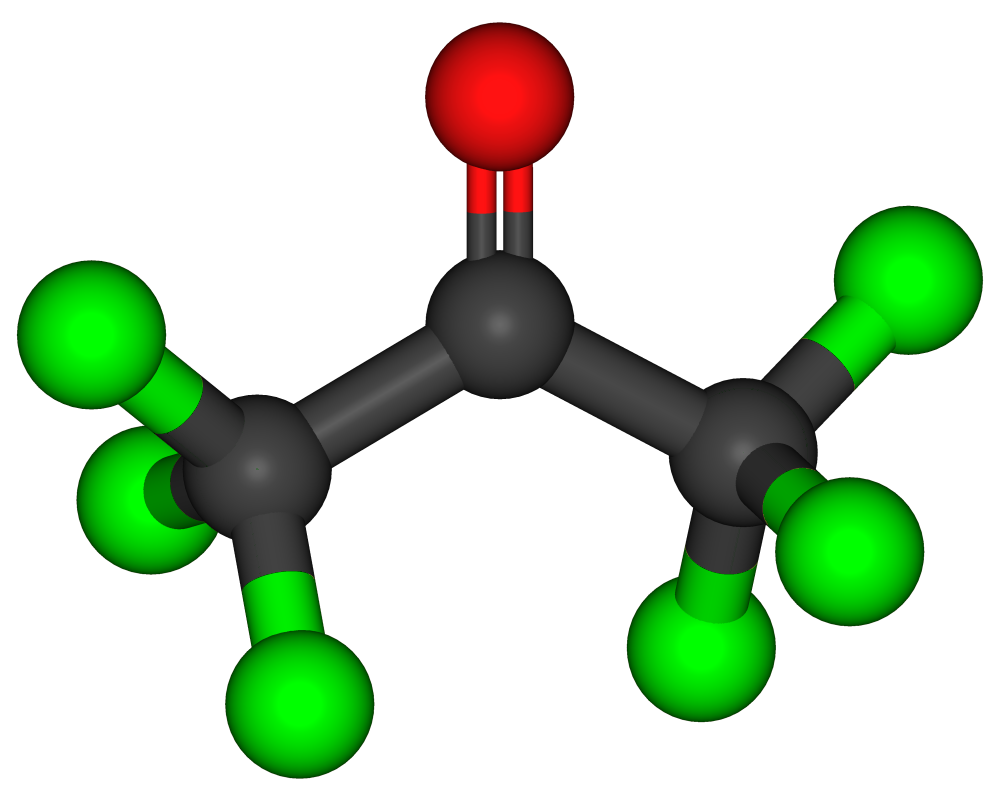

Names
- Preferred IUPAC name 1,1,1,3,3,3-Hexachloropropan-2-one
- Other names perchloroacetone HCA

Identifiers
CAS Number	116-16-5
3D model (JSmol)	Interactive image
ChEBI	CHEBI:82243
ChEMBL	ChEMBL3182582
ChemSpider	13873693
ECHA InfoCard	100.003.754
EC Number	204-129-5
KEGG	C19122
PubChem CID	8303
RTECS number	UC2100000
UNII	RU0LGU279Y
UN number	2661
CompTox Dashboard (EPA)	DTXSID7021601
- InChI: InChI=1S/C3Cl6O/c4-2(5,6)1(10)3(7,8)9 Key: DOJXGHGHTWFZHK-UHFFFAOYSA-N; InChI=1/C3Cl6O/c4-2(5,6)1(10)3(7,8)9 Key: DOJXGHGHTWFZHK-UHFFFAOYAW
- SMILES: ClC(Cl)(Cl)C(=O)C(Cl)(Cl)Cl

Properties
Chemical formula	C_{3}Cl_{6}O
Molar mass	264.75 g/mol
Density	1.7434 g/cm^{3}
Melting point	−2 °C (28 °F; 271 K)
Boiling point	204 °C (399 °F; 477 K)
- Except where otherwise noted, data are given for materials in their standard state (at 25 °C [77 °F], 100 kPa). verify (what is ?) Infobox references

Hexachloroacetone is an organic compound with the formula (Cl_{3}C)_{2}CO. It is also called hexachloropropanone or perchloroacetone. Numbers indicating the position of the chlorine-atoms are generally omitted as all the possible positions are substituted with chlorine. It is a colorless liquid, slightly soluble in water.

== Reactions and uses ==
Hexachloroacetone functions equivalently to trichloroacetyl chloride, i.e. as a trichloroacetylating agent.

The main use of hexachloroacetone is as a pesticide. For the use of hexachloroacetone in the preparation of a novel insect repellent (see Perkow reaction). The industrial route to hexafluoroacetone involves treatment of hexachloroacetone with HF:

(CCl_{3})_{2}CO + 6 HF → (CF_{3})_{2}CO + 6 HCl

== See also ==
- Chloroacetone
- Dichloroacetone

== Links ==
- Hexachloroacetone in the Pesticide Properties DataBase (PPDB)
