= Hydroxy ketone =

Functional group made of a ketone (>C=O) and hydroxyl (–OH) group on nearby carbons

Alpha- and beta-hydroxy ketones

In organic chemistry, a hydroxy ketone (often referred to simply as a ketol) is a functional group consisting of a ketone (>C=O) flanked by a hydroxyl group (−OH). Chemicals in this group can be classified by the position of the hydroxyl relative to the ketone. The two main classes have the hydroxyl on the alpha or beta carbon, that is, on the immediately adjacent carbon or the next-further carbon, respectively. Thus, the general structure of the two main classes are R−C(=O)−CH(OH)−R" (alpha) and R−C(=O)−CH_{2}−CH(OH)−R' (beta).

Alpha-hydroxy ketones are also called acyloins. They are commonly formed by condensation or reductive coupling of two carbonyl (C=O) compounds or oxidation of ketones. The simplest such compound is hydroxyacetone. If the alcohol is primary, alpha-hydroxy ketones give a positive Fehling's test.

Beta-hydroxy ketones are a type of aldol. They are commonly formed by an aldol reaction between two carbonyl compounds. A simple example is diacetone alcohol.

== See also ==
- Examples of notable hydroxy ketone compounds:
  - Category:Acyloins
  - Category:Beta-hydroxy ketones
