= Trithioacetone =

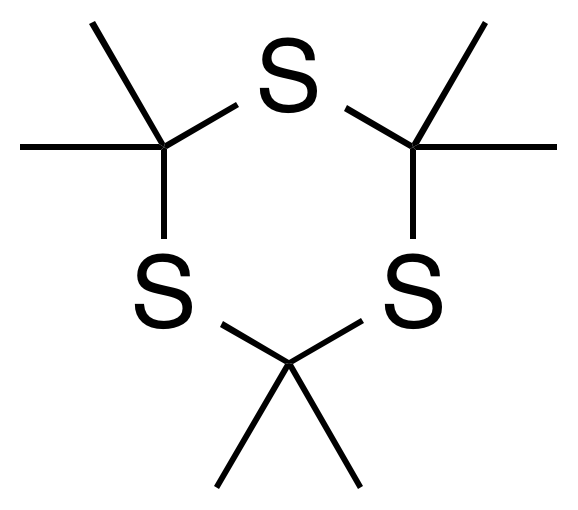

Names
- Preferred IUPAC name Hexamethyl-1,3,5-trithiane
- Other names Trithioacetone

Identifiers
CAS Number	828-26-2
3D model (JSmol)	Interactive image
Beilstein Reference	5-19-09-00119
ChEMBL	ChEMBL3187896
ChemSpider	12678
ECHA InfoCard	100.011.438
EC Number	212-582-5
PubChem CID	13233
UNII	L0ME5B2ZWY
CompTox Dashboard (EPA)	DTXSID2047723
- InChI: InChI=1S/C9H18S3/c1-7(2)10-8(3,4)12-9(5,6)11-7/h1-6H3 Key: NBNWHQAWKFYFKI-UHFFFAOYSA-N
- SMILES: C1(SC(SC(S1)(C)C)(C)C)(C)C

Properties
Chemical formula	C_{9}H_{18}S_{3}
Molar mass	222.42 g·mol^{−1}
Odor	Unpleasant, sulfurous
Density	1.0660 to 1.0700 g/mL
Melting point	21.8°C
Boiling point	107°C/10mmHg
Refractive index (n_{D})	1.5390 to 1.5430

Hazards
- GHS labelling
Pictograms	(GHS07: Exclamation mark)
Signal word	Warning
Hazard statements	H315, H319, H335
Precautionary statements	P261, P264, P271, P280, P302+P352, P304+P340, P305+P351+P338, P312, P321, P332+P313, P337+P313, P362, P403+P233, P405, P501
- Except where otherwise noted, data are given for materials in their standard state (at 25 °C [77 °F], 100 kPa). Infobox references

Trithioacetone (2,2,4,4,6,6-hexamethyl-1,3,5-trithiane) is an organic chemical with formula C_{9}H_{18}S_{3}. Its covalent structure is [–C(CH_{3})_{2}–S–]_{3}, that is, a six-membered ring of alternating carbon and sulfur atoms, with two methyl groups attached to each carbon. It can be viewed as a derivative of 1,3,5-trithiane, with methyl-group substituents for all of the hydrogen atoms in that parent structure.

The compound Trithioacetone is a stable cyclic trimer of thioacetone (propane-2-thione), which by itself is an unstable compound. In contrast, the analogous trioxane compound, 2,2,4,4,6,6-hexamethyl-1,3,5-trioxane (Triacetone), with oxygen atoms in place of the sulfur atoms, seems to be unstable, while its corresponding monomer acetone (2-propanone) is stable.

== Synthesis ==
Trithioacetone was first made in 1889 by Baumann and Fromm, by reaction of hydrogen sulfide with acetone. In the presence of an acidified ZnCl_{2} catalyst at 25 °C, one obtains a product that is 60–70% trithioacetone, 30–40% of 2,2-propanedithiol, and small amounts of two isomeric impurities, 3,3,5,5,6,6-hexamethyl-1,2,4-trithiane and 4-mercapto-2,2,4,6,6-pentamethyl-1,3-dithiane. The product can also be obtained by pyrolysis of allyl isopropyl sulfide.

== Reactions ==
Pyrolysis of trithioacetone at 500–650 °C and 5–20 mm of Hg gives thioacetone, that can be collected by a cold trap at −78 °C.

Pyrolysis/polymerization between trithioacetone (left) and thioacetone (right).

== Uses ==
Trithioacetone is found in some flavoring agents. Its FEMA number is 3475.

== Toxicity ==
The LD_{50} (oral) in mice is 2.4 g/kg.

== See also ==
- Hexamethylcyclotrisiloxane, an analog with a silicon-oxygen ring instead of a carbon-sulfur one.
- Hexamethylcyclotrisilazane, with a silicon-nitrogen ring.
