= Hydroxyacetone =

Names
- Preferred IUPAC name 1-Hydroxyacetone
- Systematic IUPAC name 1-Hydroxypropan-2-one
- Other names 1-Hydroxy-2-propanone; Acetomethyl alcohol Acetol

Identifiers
| CAS Number | 116-09-6 |
| 3D model (JSmol) | Interactive image |
| Beilstein Reference | 605368 |
| ChemSpider | 21106125 |
| ECHA InfoCard | 100.003.750 |
| EC Number | 204-124-8 |
| PubChem CID | 8299 |
| UNII | 7I7YM0835W |
| CompTox Dashboard (EPA) | DTXSID8051590 |
- InChI: InChI=1S/C3H6O2/c1-3(5)2-4/h4H,2H2,1H3 Key: XLSMFKSTNGKWQX-UHFFFAOYSA-N
- SMILES: CC(=O)CO

Properties
| Chemical formula | C_{3}H_{6}O_{2} |
| Molar mass | 74.079 g·mol^{−1} |
| Appearance | Colorless liquid |
| Odor | Sweet |
| Density | 1.059 g/cm^{3} |
| Melting point | −17 °C (1 °F; 256 K) |
| Boiling point | 145–146 °C (293–295 °F; 418–419 K) |
| Vapor pressure | 7.5 hPa at 20 °C |
| Refractive index (n_{D}) | 1.415 |

Hazards
- GHS labelling
| Hazard statements | H226 |
| Flash point | 56 °C (closed cup) |
| Explosive limits | Upper limit: 14.9%(V); Lower limit: 3%(V) |
- Lethal dose or concentration (LD, LC)
| LD_{50} (median dose) | 2200 mg/kg (rat, oral) |
- Except where otherwise noted, data are given for materials in their standard state (at 25 °C [77 °F], 100 kPa). Infobox references

Hydroxyacetone, also known as acetol, is the organic chemical with the formula CH_{3}C(O)CH_{2}OH. It consists of a primary alcohol substituent on acetone. It is an α-hydroxyketone, also called a ketol, and is the simplest hydroxy ketone structure. It is a colorless, distillable liquid.

== Preparation ==
It is produced commercially by dehydration of glycerol.

Hydroxyacetone is commercially available, but it also may be synthesized on a laboratory scale by a substitution reaction on bromoacetone.

== Reactions ==
It undergoes rapid polymerization, including forming a hemiacetal cyclic dimer. Under alkaline conditions, it undergoes a rapid aldol condensation.

Hydroxyacetone can be produced by degradation of various sugars. In foods, it is formed by the Maillard reaction. It reacts further to form other compounds with various aromas. As such it finds some use as a flavoring.

== See also ==
- Acyloin, the simplest secondary α-hydroxy ketone.
