= DMTMM =

- DMTMM Chemical Structure

Names
- Preferred IUPAC name 4-(4,6-Dimethoxy-1,3,5-triazin-2-yl)-4-methylmorpholin-4-ium chloride
- Other names DMTMM, MMTM

Identifiers
CAS Number	3945-69-5
3D model (JSmol)	Interactive image
ChemSpider	2015817
EC Number	447-230-1
PubChem CID	2734059
UNII	BLD6N6AV8L
CompTox Dashboard (EPA)	DTXSID50370104
- InChI: InChI=1S/C10H17N4O3.ClH/c1-14(4-6-17-7-5-14)8-11-9(15-2)13-10(12-8)16-3;/h4-7H2,1-3H3;1H/q+1;/p-1 Key: BMTZEAOGFDXDAD-UHFFFAOYSA-M
- SMILES: C[N+]1(CCOCC1)C2=NC(=NC(=N2)OC)OC.[Cl-]

Properties
Chemical formula	C_{10}H_{17}ClN_{4}O_{3}
Molar mass	276.72 g·mol^{−1}

Hazards
- GHS labelling
Pictograms	(GHS05: Corrosive) (GHS07: Exclamation mark)
Signal word	Danger
Hazard statements	H302, H314
Precautionary statements	P260, P264, P270, P280, P301+P312, P301+P330+P331, P303+P361+P353, P304+P340, P305+P351+P338, P310, P321, P363, P405, P501
- Except where otherwise noted, data are given for materials in their standard state (at 25 °C [77 °F], 100 kPa). Infobox references

DMTMM (4-(4,6-dimethoxy-1,3,5-triazin-2-yl)-4-methyl-morpholinium chloride) is an organic triazine derivative commonly used for activation of carboxylic acids, particularly for amide synthesis. Amide coupling is one of the most common reactions in organic chemistry and DMTMM is one reagent used for that reaction. The mechanism of DMTMM coupling is similar to other common amide coupling reactions involving activated carboxylic acids. Its precursor, 2-chloro-4,6-dimethoxy-1,3,5-triazine (CDMT), has also been used for amide coupling. DMTMM has also been used to synthesize other carboxylic functional groups such as esters and anhydrides. DMTMM is usually used in the chloride form but the tetrafluoroborate salt is also commercially available.

== Synthesis ==
DMTMM is prepared by reaction of 2-chloro-4,6-dimethoxy-1,3,5-triazine (CDMT) with N-methylmorpholine (NMM). It was first reported in 1999. CDMT spontaneously reacts with NMM to form the quaternary ammonium chloride salt of DMTMM. DMTMM should be stored at -20 °C and kept dry.

== Reactions ==
=== Amides ===
Amides can be readily prepared from the corresponding carboxylic acid and amine using DMTMM coupling. DMTMM has been shown to be preferable to other coupling agents in several cases, such as for sterically hindered amines and for ligation of polysaccharides such as hyaluronic acid.

=== Other carboxylic derivatives ===
Despite primarily being used for amide synthesis, DMTMM can also be used to make esters from the corresponding alcohol and carboxylic acid. DMTMM has also been applied to anhydride synthesis. The synthesis of each carboxylic derivative is similar, relying on the activation of the starting carboxylic acid followed by nucleophilic attack by another molecule.

== Coupling mechanism ==
DMTMM uses a typical mechanism to form carboxylic acid derivatives. First, the carboxylic acid reacts with DMTMM to form the active ester, releasing a molecule of N-methylmorpholinium (NMM). The resulting ester is highly reactive and can undergo a nucleophilic attack by an amine, an alcohol, or another nucleophile. A molecule of 4,6,-dimethoxy-1,3,5-triazin-2-ol is released and the corresponding carboxylic derivative is formed.

DMTMM coupling mechanism

== Safety ==
DMTMM may be toxic if ingested. In vivo dermal sensitization studies according to OECD 429 confirmed DMTMM is a moderate skin sensitizer, showing a response at 0.9 wt% in the Local Lymph Node Assay (LLNA) placing it in Globally Harmonized System of Classification and Labelling of Chemicals (GHS) Dermal Sensitization Category 1A. Protective gloves, lab coats, and eye protection should be employed to reduce exposure while using DMTMM.
