= Bromoacetone =

Derivative of acetone

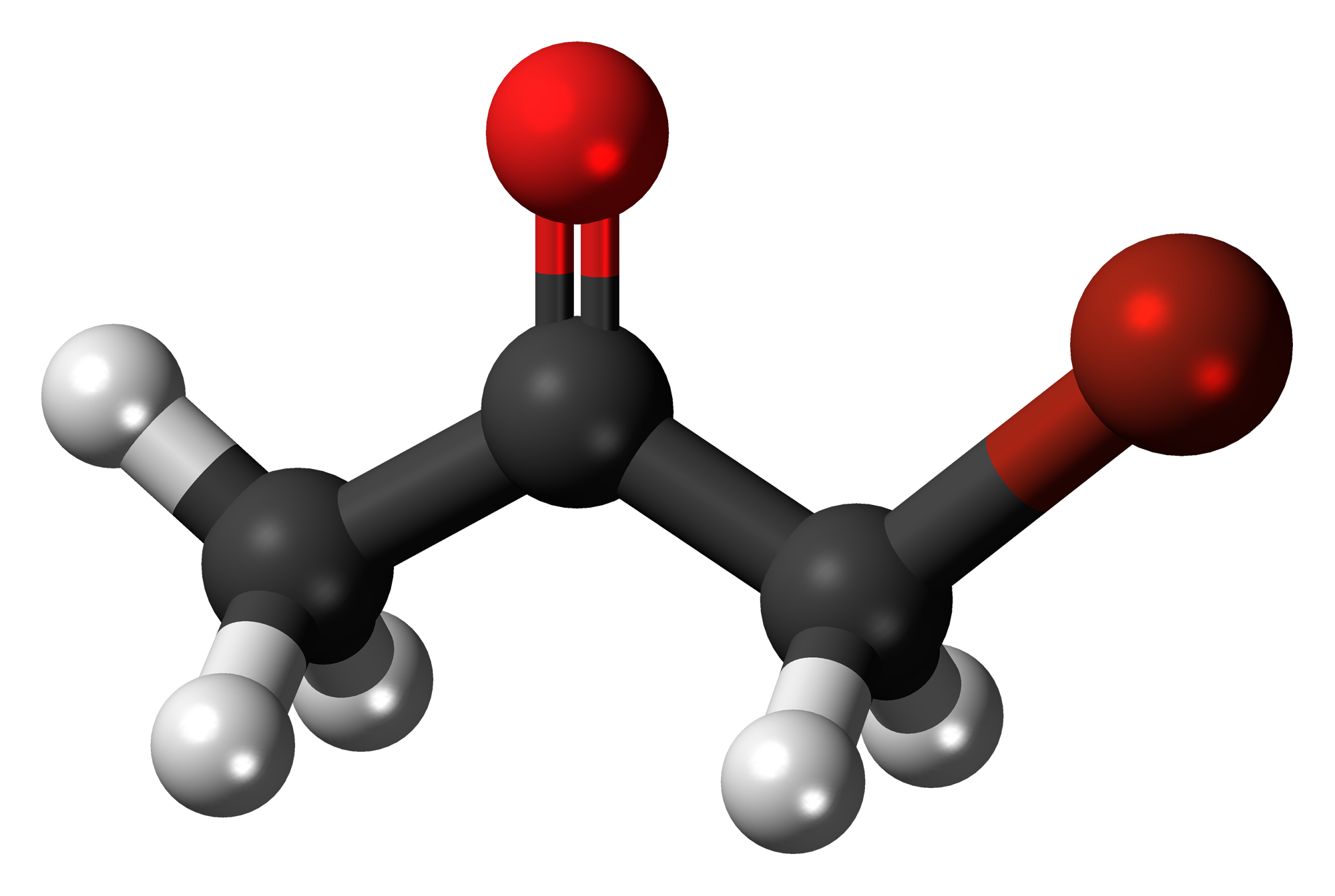

Names
- Preferred IUPAC name 1-Bromopropan-2-one
- Other names Bromoacetone; 1-Bromo-2-propanone α-Bromoacetone; Acetonyl bromide Acetyl methyl bromide Bromomethyl methyl ketone Monobromoacetone; Martonite; BA; UN 1569

Identifiers
CAS Number	598-31-2
3D model (JSmol)	Interactive image
ChEBI	CHEBI:51845
ChEMBL	ChEMBL1085947
ChemSpider	11223
ECHA InfoCard	100.009.027
IUPHAR/BPS	6293
PubChem CID	11715
RTECS number	UC0525000
UNII	3O8L0EWR5Q
CompTox Dashboard (EPA)	DTXSID6060507
- InChI: InChI=1S/C3H5BrO/c1-3(5)2-4/h2H2,1H3 Key: VQFAIAKCILWQPZ-UHFFFAOYSA-N; InChI=1/C3H5BrO/c1-3(5)2-4/h2H2,1H3 Key: VQFAIAKCILWQPZ-UHFFFAOYAC
- SMILES: BrCC(=O)C

Properties
Chemical formula	C_{3}H_{5}BrO
Molar mass	136.976 g·mol^{−1}
Appearance	Colorless liquid
Density	1.634 g/cm^{3}
Melting point	−36.5 °C (−33.7 °F; 236.7 K)
Boiling point	137 °C (279 °F; 410 K)
Vapor pressure	1.1 kPa (20 °C)

Hazards
Flash point	51.1 °C (124.0 °F; 324.2 K)
Safety data sheet (SDS)	MSDS at ILO
- Except where otherwise noted, data are given for materials in their standard state (at 25 °C [77 °F], 100 kPa). verify (what is ?) Infobox references

Bromoacetone is an organic compound with the formula CH_{3}COCH_{2}Br. It is a colorless liquid although impure samples appear yellow or even brown. It is a lachrymatory agent and a precursor to other organic compounds.

== Occurrence in nature ==
Bromoacetone is present (less than 1%) in the essential oil of a seaweed (Asparagopsis taxiformis) from the vicinity of the Hawaiian Islands.

== Synthesis ==
Bromoacetone is available commercially, sometimes stabilized with magnesium oxide. It was first described in the 19th century, attributed to N. Sokolowsky.

Acetone and bromine form bromoacetone.

Bromoacetone is prepared by combining bromine and acetone, with catalytic acid. As with all ketones, acetone enolizes in the presence of acids or bases. The alpha carbon then undergoes electrophilic substitution with bromine. The main difficulty with this method is over-bromination, resulting in di- and tribrominated products. If a base is present, bromoform is obtained instead, by the haloform reaction.

== Applications ==
It was used in World War I as a chemical weapon, called BA by British and B-Stoff (Weisskreuz) by Germans. Due to its toxicity, it is not used as a riot control agent anymore. Bromoacetone is a versatile reagent in organic synthesis. It is, for example, the precursor to hydroxyacetone by reaction with aqueous sodium hydroxide.

== See also ==
- Use of poison gas in World War I
- Chloroacetone
- Fluoroacetone
- Iodoacetone
- Thioacetone
