= Ammelide =

Chemical compound

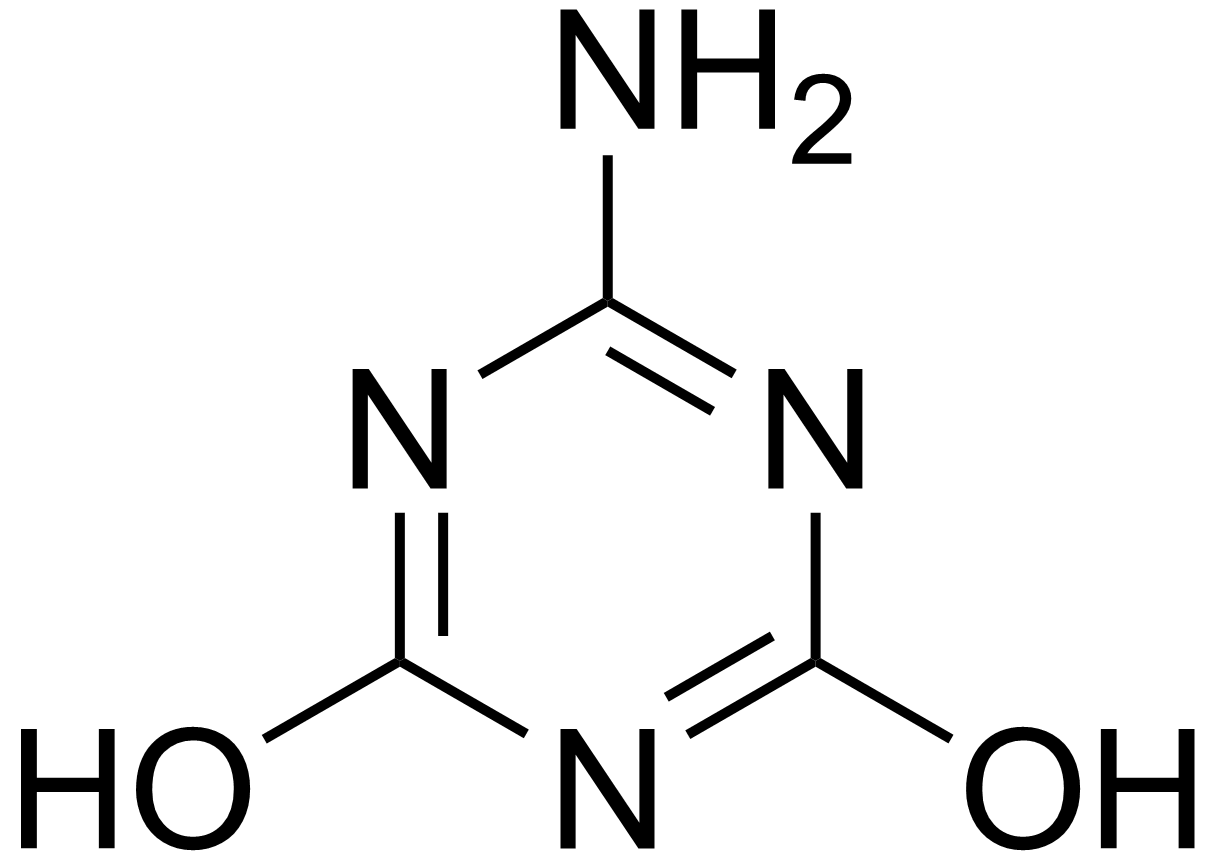
- Structural formula

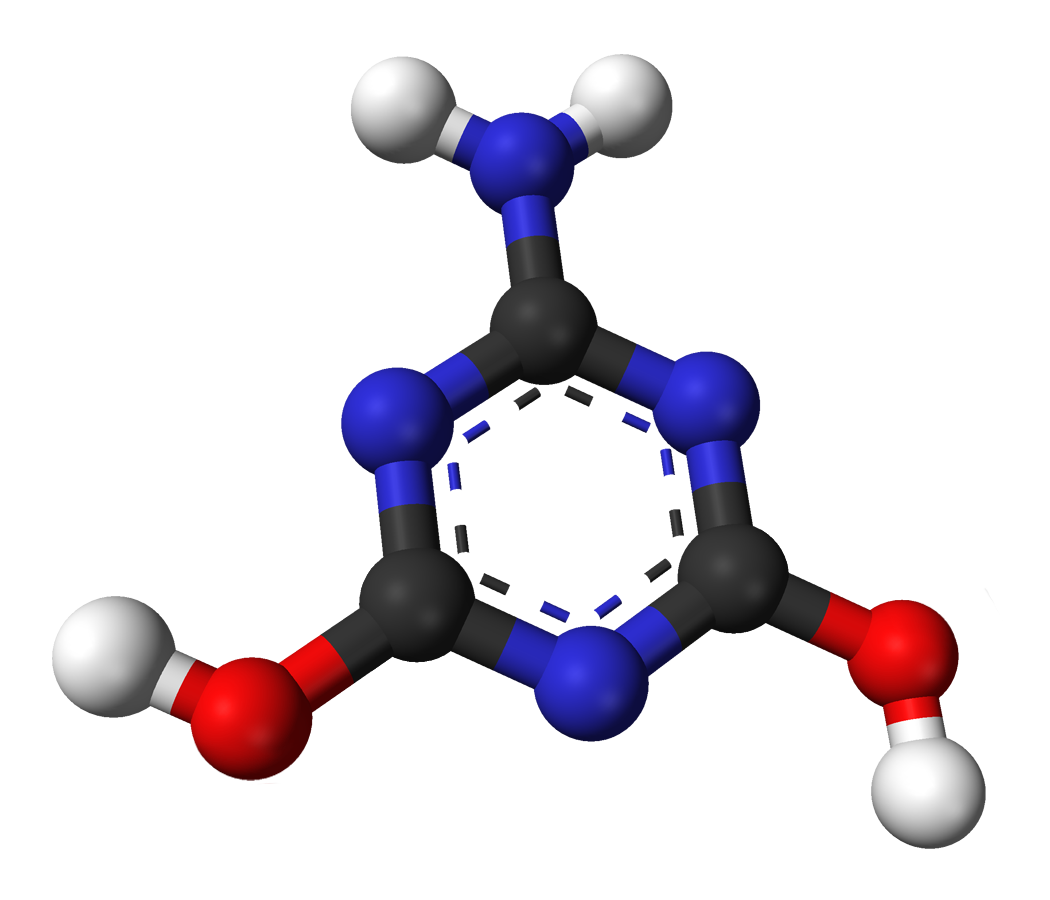
- Ball-and-stick model

Names
- Preferred IUPAC name 6-Amino-1,3,5-triazine-2,4-diol
- Other names Ammelid, 2-Amino-1,3,5-triazine-4,6-dione, 2-Amino-4,6-dihydroxy-s-triazine

Identifiers
CAS Number	645-93-2
3D model (JSmol)	Interactive image
ChEBI	CHEBI:28134
ChemSpider	12064
ECHA InfoCard	100.010.416
KEGG	C08734
PubChem CID	12584
UNII	J604QC4098
CompTox Dashboard (EPA)	DTXSID10214757
- InChI: InChI=1S/C3H4N4O2/c4-1-5-2(8)7-3(9)6-1/h(H4,4,5,6,7,8,9) Key: YSKUZVBSHIWEFK-UHFFFAOYSA-N; InChI=1/C3H4N4O2/c4-1-5-2(8)7-3(9)6-1/h(H4,4,5,6,7,8,9) Key: YSKUZVBSHIWEFK-UHFFFAOYAA
- SMILES: O=C1NC(=N/C(=O)N1)\N

Properties
Chemical formula	C_{3}H_{4}N_{4}O_{2}
Molar mass	128.09 g/mol
Appearance	white powder
Solubility in water	insoluble
Solubility	soluble in concentrated mineral acids, alkalis and ammonia
- Except where otherwise noted, data are given for materials in their standard state (at 25 °C [77 °F], 100 kPa). verify (what is ?) Infobox references

Ammelide (6-amino-2,4-dihydroxy-1,3,5-triazine) is a triazine and the hydrolysis product of ammeline.

== Synthesis ==
Ammelide can be obtained by heating dicyandiamide with aqueous ammonia at 160−170 °C. It can also be synthesized by heating melam with concentrated sulfuric acid for a short time at 190 °C.

== Chemical property ==
Ammelide forms salts with both acids (hydrochloric acid, nitric acid, sulfuric acid) and bases (sodium hydroxide, ammonium, calcium hydroxide).

Ammelide decomposes at 170 °C with water to form carbon dioxide and ammonia. It can be converted into cyanuric acid by oxidizing agents (e.g. potassium permanganate) or by boiling with acids or alkalis.
