= N-Methylmorpholine =

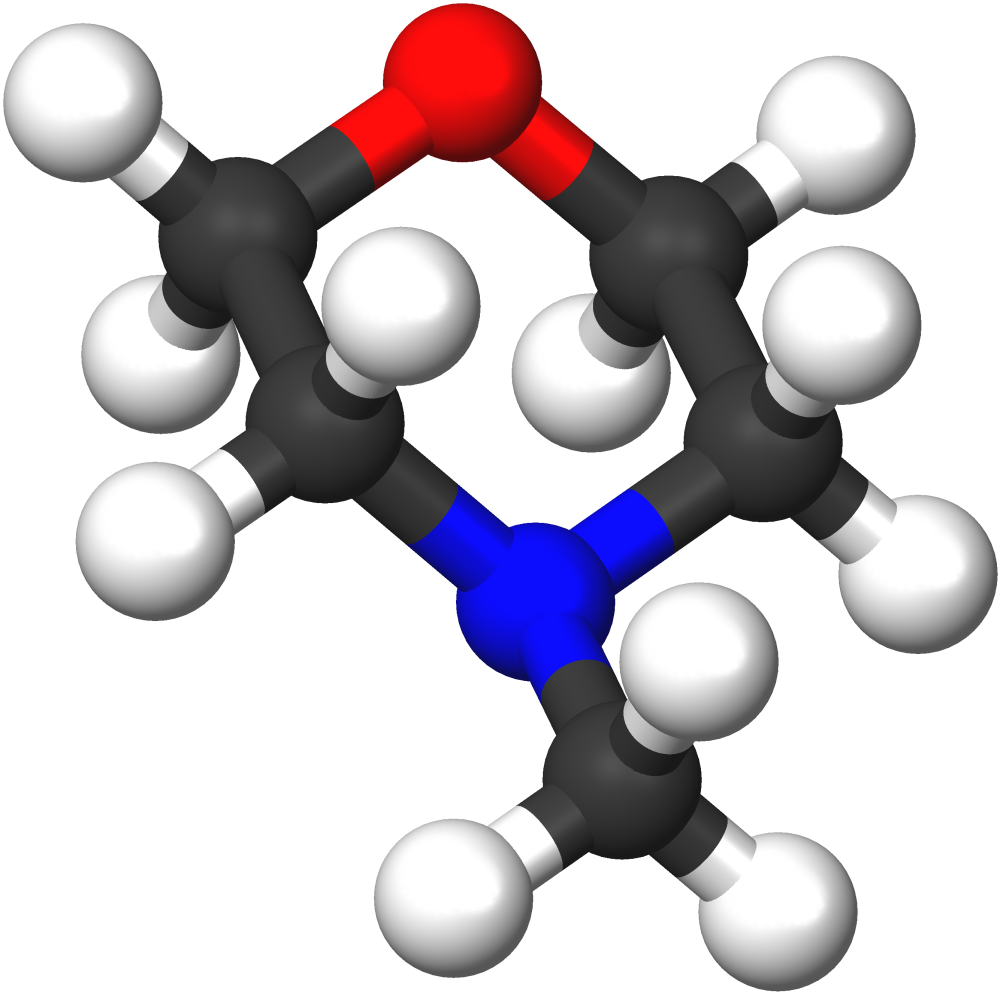

Names
- IUPAC name 4-Methylmorpholine

Identifiers
CAS Number	109-02-4
3D model (JSmol)	Interactive image
Abbreviations	NMM
ChEMBL	ChEMBL2448839
ChemSpider	7684
ECHA InfoCard	100.003.310
EC Number	203-640-0
PubChem CID	7972
UNII	11P91ANU5X
UN number	2535
CompTox Dashboard (EPA)	DTXSID9029146
- InChI: InChI=1S/C5H11NO/c1-6-2-4-7-5-3-6/h2-5H2,1H3 Key: SJRJJKPEHAURKC-UHFFFAOYSA-N; InChI=1/C5H11NO/c1-6-2-4-7-5-3-6/h2-5H2,1H3 Key: SJRJJKPEHAURKC-UHFFFAOYAK
- SMILES: O1CCN(C)CC1

Properties
Chemical formula	C_{5}H_{11}NO
Molar mass	101.149 g·mol^{−1}
Appearance	Liquid
Odor	Strongly unpleasant, fish-like
Density	0.92 g/cm^{3}
Melting point	−66 °C (−87 °F; 207 K)
Boiling point	115 to 116 °C (239 to 241 °F; 388 to 389 K)
Acidity (pK_{a})	7.38 (for the conjugate acid) (H_{2}O)

Hazards
- GHS labelling
Pictograms	(GHS02: Flammable) (GHS05: Corrosive) (GHS07: Exclamation mark)
Signal word	Danger
Hazard statements	H225, H302, H312, H314, H332
Precautionary statements	P210, P233, P240, P241, P242, P243, P260, P264, P270, P271, P280, P301+P312, P301+P330+P331, P302+P352, P303+P361+P353, P304+P312, P304+P340, P305+P351+P338, P310, P312, P321, P322, P330, P363, P370+P378, P403+P235, P405, P501
- Except where otherwise noted, data are given for materials in their standard state (at 25 °C [77 °F], 100 kPa). verify (what is ?) Infobox references

N-Methylmorpholine is the organic compound with the formula O(CH_{2}CH_{2})_{2}NCH_{3}. It is a colorless liquid. It is a cyclic tertiary amine. It is used as a base catalyst for generation of polyurethanes and other reactions. It is produced by the reaction of methylamine and diethylene glycol as well as by the hydrogenolysis of N-formylmorpholine. It is the precursor to N-methylmorpholine N-oxide, a commercially important oxidant.
