= Chloroacetone =

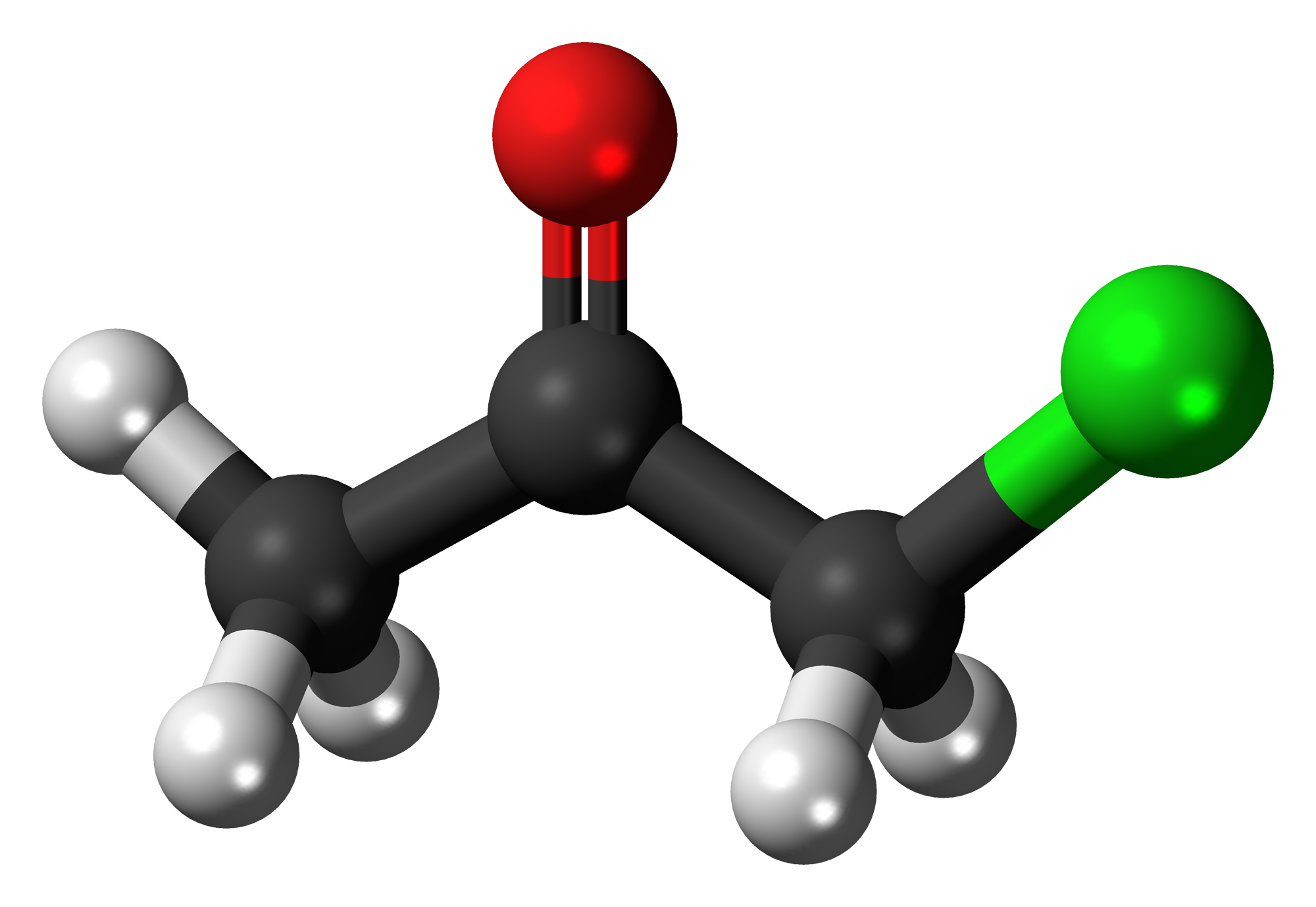

Names
- Preferred IUPAC name 1-Chloropropan-2-one
- Other names Acetonyl chloride, chloropropanone, 1-chloro-2-propanone, monochloroacetone, 1-chloro-2-ketopropane, 1-chloro-2-oxypropane UN 1695

Identifiers
CAS Number	78-95-5
3D model (JSmol)	Interactive image
Beilstein Reference	605369
ChEBI	CHEBI:47220
ChemSpider	6323
ECHA InfoCard	100.001.056
EC Number	201-161-1
PubChem CID	6571
RTECS number	UC0700000
UNII	60ZTR74268
CompTox Dashboard (EPA)	DTXSID0021547
- InChI: InChI=1S/C3H5ClO/c1-3(5)2-4/h2H2,1H3 Key: BULLHNJGPPOUOX-UHFFFAOYSA-N; Key: BULLHNJGPPOUOX-UHFFFAOYAY
- SMILES: ClCC(=O)C

Properties
Chemical formula	C_{3}H_{5}ClO
Molar mass	92.52 g·mol^{−1}
Appearance	Colorless liquid, oxidizes to amber
Density	1.123 g/cm^{3}
Melting point	−44.5 °C (−48.1 °F; 228.7 K)
Boiling point	119 °C (246 °F; 392 K)
Solubility in water	10 g/100 mL at 20 °C
Solubility	miscible with alcohol, ether, chloroform
Vapor pressure	1.5 kPa
Magnetic susceptibility (χ)	−50.9·10^{−6} cm^{3}/mol
Dipole moment	2.36

Hazards
Flash point	35 °C (95 °F; 308 K)
Autoignition temperature	610 °C (1,130 °F; 883 K)
Explosive limits	3.4% - ?
- Lethal dose or concentration (LD, LC)
LD_{50} (median dose)	100 mg/kg (rats, oral)
- Except where otherwise noted, data are given for materials in their standard state (at 25 °C [77 °F], 100 kPa). verify (what is ?) Infobox references

Chloroacetone is a liquid, a chemical compound with the formula CH_{3}COCH_{2}Cl. Regulated for its potential as a tear gas, it is primarily a chemical intermediate in commerce.

== Properties ==
At STP it is a colorless liquid with a pungent odor. On exposure to light, it turns to a dark yellow-amber color. It was used as a tear gas in World War I.

== Synthesis ==
Chloroacetone may be synthesized from the reaction between chlorine and diketene, or by the chlorination of acetone.

== Applications ==
Chloroacetone is primarily an intermediate in chemical manufacture. In the early 2000s, it was used to make dye couplers for colour film photography. In the pharmaceutical industry, it is a precursor to phenoxyacetone.

It is also used in the Feist-Benary synthesis of furans:

== Purification ==
Chloroacetone purchased from commercial suppliers contains 5% impurities including mesityl oxide, which is not removed by distillation. Mesityl oxide can be oxidized using acidified KMnO_{4} to form a diol (followed by separation with ether), which is removed on subsequent distillation.

== Transportation regulations ==
Transportation of unstabilized chloroacetone has been banned in the United States by the US Department of Transportation. Stabilized chloroacetone is in hazard class 6.1 (Poison Inhalation Hazard). Its UN number is 1695.

== See also ==
- Bromoacetone
- Dichloroacetone
- Fluoroacetone
- Hexachloroacetone
- Use of poison gas in World War I
