= Pentanenitrile =

Chemical compound (C4H9CN)

Names
- Preferred IUPAC name Pentanenitrile
- Other names: Valeronitrile; n-valeronitrile; 1-Cyanobutane

Identifiers
CAS Number	110-59-8
3D model (JSmol)	Interactive image
ChEMBL	ChEMBL1503158
ChemSpider	7770
ECHA InfoCard	100.003.439
EC Number	203-781-8
PubChem CID	8061
UNII	X44H3R47D4
UN number	3273
CompTox Dashboard (EPA)	DTXSID3026275
- InChI: InChI=1S/C5H9N/c1-2-3-4-5-6/h2-4H2,1H3 Key: RFFFKMOABOFIDF-UHFFFAOYSA-N
- SMILES: CCCCC#N

Properties
Chemical formula	C_{5}H_{9}N
Molar mass	83.134 g·mol^{−1}
Appearance	Colorless liquid
Density	0.8008 g·cm^{3}
Melting point	−96.2 °C (−141.2 °F; 177.0 K)
Boiling point	141 °C; 286 °F; 414 K
Critical point (T, P)	610.3 K at 35.80 bar
Solubility in water	insoluble
Solubility	soluble in benzene, acetone, ether
Vapor pressure	5 mmHg
Refractive index (n_{D})	1.3949

Hazards
- GHS labelling
Pictograms	(GHS02: Flammable) (GHS06: Toxic) (GHS07: Exclamation mark)
Signal word	Danger
Hazard statements	H226, H301, H302
Precautionary statements	P210, P233, P240, P241, P242, P243, P264, P270, P280, P301+P310, P301+P312, P303+P361+P353, P321, P330, P370+P378, P403+P235, P405, P501
NFPA 704 (fire diamond)	3 3 0
Flash point	40 °C (104 °F; 313 K)
- Lethal dose or concentration (LD, LC)
LD_{50} (median dose)	191 mg/kg fat

Related compounds
Related alkanenitriles	Isobutyronitrile; Propanenitrile; Malononitrile; Pivalonitrile; Succinonitrile; Glutaronitrile; Butyronitrile
- Except where otherwise noted, data are given for materials in their standard state (at 25 °C [77 °F], 100 kPa). Infobox references

Pentanenitrile, valeronitrile or butyl cyanide is a nitrile with the formula C_{4}H_{9}CN. This can be written BuCN, with Bu representing an n-butyl (linear butyl group).

== Production ==
Pentanenitrile can be produced by heating 1-chlorobutane with sodium cyanide in dimethyl sulfoxide. This reaction takes about 20 minutes, keeping the temperature below 160 °C. The yield is about 93%.

Another way to get the substance is by heating valeraldehyde with hydroxylamine.

Pentanenitrile is contained in bone oil.

== Properties ==
The pentanenitrile molecule is flexible and can adopt a number of different conformers, so that it will naturally be a mixture. These conformers are called anti-anti (30%), anti-gauche (46%), gauche-anti, gauche-gauche-cis, and gauche-gauche-trans.

== Biology ==
Pentanenitrile is toxic to animals, and produces its action by the liberation of cyanide by cytochrome P450. The cyanide is detoxified and excreted in urine as thiocyanate.

Pentanenitrile is found in Brassica species and varieties such as broccoli.

Pentanenitrile is hydrolyzed to valeric acid by the fungi Gibberella intermedia, Fusarium oxysporum, and Aspergillus niger in which it induces production of the nitrilase enzyme.
