= Tetramethylsuccinonitrile =

Partially condensed, skeletal formula of tetramethylsuccinonitrile
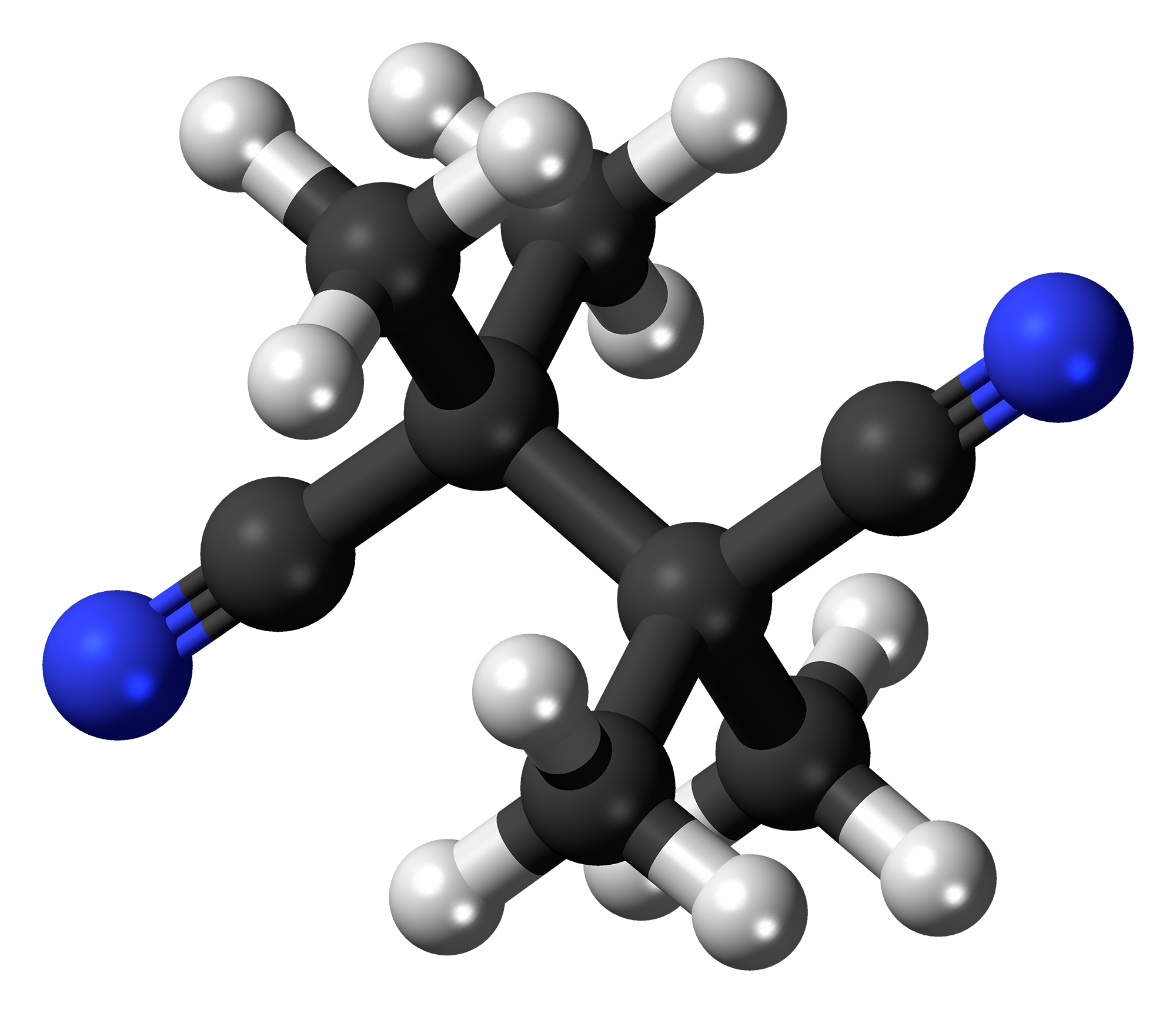

Names
- Preferred IUPAC name Tetramethylbutanedinitrile
- Other names Butanedinitrile, 2,2,3,3-tetramethyl

Identifiers
CAS Number	3333-52-6
3D model (JSmol)	Interactive image
Abbreviations	TMSN
ChemSpider	17700
ECHA InfoCard	100.129.378
MeSH	tetramethylsuccinonitrile
PubChem CID	18745
UNII	116XMU2GHK
CompTox Dashboard (EPA)	DTXSID0026125
- InChI: InChI=1S/C8H12N2/c1-7(2,5-9)8(3,4)6-10/h1-4H3 Key: ZVQXQPNJHRNGID-UHFFFAOYSA-N
- SMILES: CC(C)(C#N)C(C)(C)C#N

Properties
Chemical formula	C_{8}H_{12}N_{2}
Molar mass	136.198 g·mol^{−1}
Appearance	Colourless crystals
Odor	odorless
Density	1.07 g mL^{−1}
Melting point	169.1 °C; 336.3 °F; 442.2 K
Boiling point	sublimes

Thermochemistry
Std enthalpy of formation (Δ_{f}H^{⦵}_{298})	13.6–16.2 kJ mol^{−1}
Std enthalpy of combustion (Δ_{c}H^{⦵}_{298})	−4.8767–−4.8793 MJ mol^{−1}

Hazards
- GHS labelling
Pictograms	(GHS06: Toxic) (GHS07: Exclamation mark) (GHS08: Health hazard)
Signal word	Danger
Hazard statements	H300, H310, H315, H319, H330, H370, H372, H412
Precautionary statements	P260, P262, P264, P270, P271, P273, P280, P284, P301+P310, P302+P350, P302+P352, P304+P340, P305+P351+P338, P307+P311, P310, P314, P320, P321, P330, P332+P313, P337+P313, P361, P362, P363, P403+P233, P405, P501
- Lethal dose or concentration (LD, LC)
LD_{50} (median dose)	38.9 mg/kg (rat, oral)
LC_{Lo} (lowest published)	28 ppm (mouse, 3 hr); 6 ppm (rat, 30 hr)
- NIOSH (US health exposure limits)
PEL (Permissible)	TWA 3 mg/m^{3} (0.5 ppm) [skin]
REL (Recommended)	TWA 3 mg/m^{3} (0.5 ppm) [skin]
IDLH (Immediate danger)	5 ppm
Safety data sheet (SDS)	ICSC 1121

Related compounds
Related alkanenitriles	Propanenitrile; Aminopropionitrile; Malononitrile; Pivalonitrile; Acetone cyanohydrin; Butyronitrile; Succinonitrile; Glutaronitrile
Related compounds	DBNPA
- Except where otherwise noted, data are given for materials in their standard state (at 25 °C [77 °F], 100 kPa). verify (what is ?) Infobox references

Tetramethylsuccinonitrile or TMSN is an organic compound with the formula (C(CH_{3})_{2}CN)_{2}, classified as a dinitrile, and a colorless and odorless solid derived from 2,2'-azobis-isobutyronitrile, a common radical initiator in the manufacture of PVC:

[(CH_{3})_{2}C(CN)]_{2}N_{2} → [(CH_{3})_{2}C(CN)]_{2} + N_{2}.

Because PVC is pervasive and can contain TMSN, the safety aspects of this dinitrile has generated interest.

In regards to occupational exposures, the U.S. Occupational Safety and Health Administration and the U.S. National Institute for Occupational Safety and Health have set limits for dermal exposure at 3 mg/m^{3} over an eight-hour time-weighted average.
