= C5H9N =

The molecular formula C_{5}H_{9}N (molar mass: 83.1317 g/mol, exact mass: 83.073499) may refer to:

- Pentanenitrile, n-BuCN, i.e. C_{4}H_{9}–C≡N
- Pivalonitrile, t-BuCN, i.e. (CH_{3})_{3}C–C≡N
- tert-Butyl isocyanide, t-BuNC, i.e. (CH_{3})_{3}C–N^{+}≡C:^{−}
- Tetrahydropyridine
