= Acetone cyanohydrin =

- Skeletal formula of acetone cyanohydrin

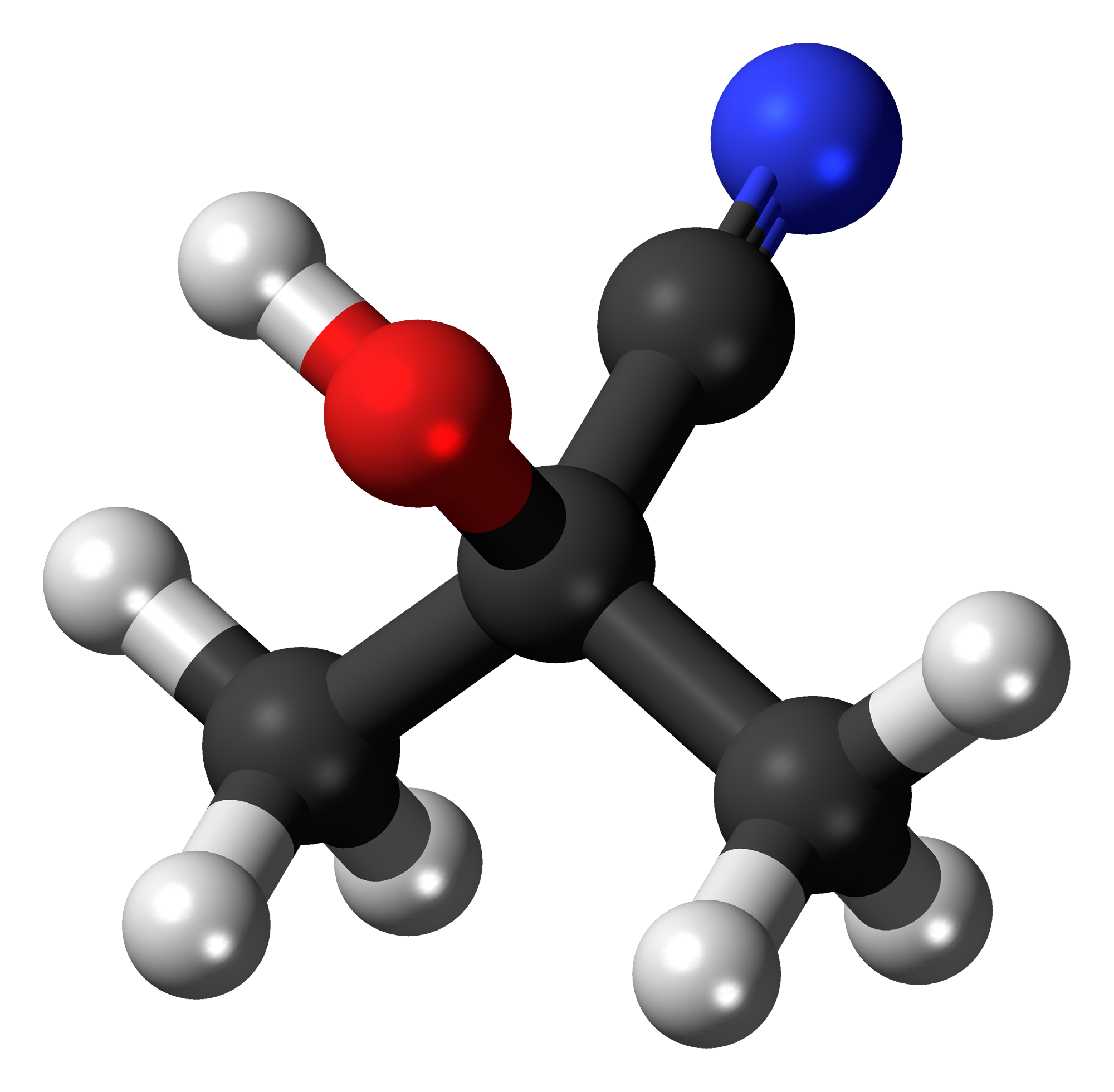
Ball and stick model of acetone cyanohydrin
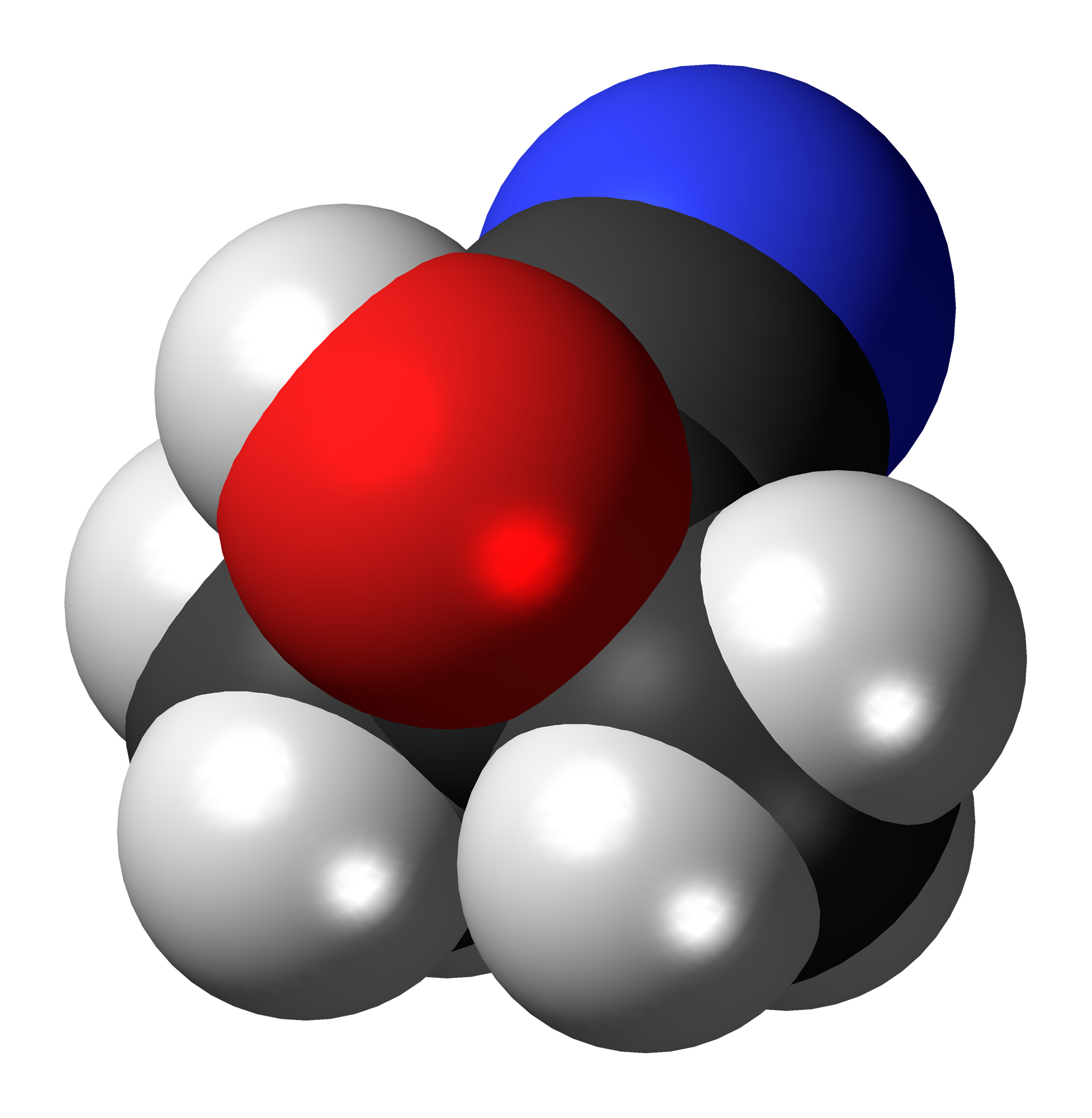
Spacefill model of acetone cyanohydrin

Names
- Preferred IUPAC name 2-Hydroxy-2-methylpropanenitrile
- Other names: Cyanohydrin-2-propanone; α-Hydroxyisobutyronitrile; 2-Hydroxy-2-methyl-propionitrile

Identifiers
CAS Number	75-86-5
3D model (JSmol)	Interactive image
Beilstein Reference	605391
ChEBI	CHEBI:15348
ChemSpider	6166
DrugBank	DB02203
ECHA InfoCard	100.000.828
EC Number	200-909-4
KEGG	C02659
MeSH	acetone+cyanohydrin
PubChem CID	6406
RTECS number	OD9275000
UNII	CO1YOV1KFI
UN number	1541
CompTox Dashboard (EPA)	DTXSID7025427
- InChI: InChI=1S/C4H7NO/c1-4(2,6)3-5/h6H,1-2H3 Key: MWFMGBPGAXYFAR-UHFFFAOYSA-N
- SMILES: CC(C)(O)C#N

Properties
Chemical formula	C_{4}H_{7}NO
Molar mass	85.106 g·mol^{−1}
Appearance	Colourless liquid
Density	932 mg·mL^{−1}
Melting point	−21.2 °C; −6.3 °F; 251.9 K
Boiling point	95 °C; 203 °F; 368 K
Vapor pressure	2 kPa (at 20 °C)
Refractive index (n_{D})	1.399

Thermochemistry
Std enthalpy of formation (Δ_{f}H^{⦵}_{298})	−121.7 to −120.1 kJ·mol^{−1}
Std enthalpy of combustion (Δ_{c}H^{⦵}_{298})	−2.4514 to −2.4498 MJ·mol^{−1}

Hazards
- GHS labelling
Pictograms	(GHS06: Toxic) (GHS09: Environmental hazard)
Signal word	Danger
Hazard statements	H300, H310, H330, H410
Precautionary statements	P260, P273, P280, P284, P301+P310
NFPA 704 (fire diamond)	4 1 2
Flash point	75 °C (167 °F; 348 K)
Explosive limits	2.25–11%
- Lethal dose or concentration (LD, LC)
LD_{50} (median dose)	15.8 mg·kg^{−1} (dermal, rabbit); 18.65 mg·kg^{−1} (oral, rat)
- NIOSH (US health exposure limits)
PEL (Permissible)	None
REL (Recommended)	C 1 ppm (4 mg·m^{−3}) [15-minute]
IDLH (Immediate danger)	N.D.
Safety data sheet (SDS)	fishersci.com

Related compounds
Related alkanenitriles	Acetonitrile; Aminoacetonitrile; Glycolonitrile; Cyanogen; Propanenitrile; Aminopropionitrile; Malononitrile; Pivalonitrile; Butyronitrile; Succinonitrile; Tetramethylsuccinonitrile
Related compounds	DBNPA
- Except where otherwise noted, data are given for materials in their standard state (at 25 °C [77 °F], 100 kPa). verify (what is ?) Infobox references

Acetone cyanohydrin (ACH) is an organic compound with the formula (CH_{3})_{2}C(OH)CN. It is a colorless liquid used in the production of methyl methacrylate, the monomer of the transparent plastic polymethyl methacrylate (PMMA), also known as acrylic. It liberates hydrogen cyanide easily, so it is used as a source of such. For this reason, this cyanohydrin is also highly toxic.

== Preparation ==
In the laboratory, this compound may be prepared by treating sodium cyanide with acetone, followed by acidification:

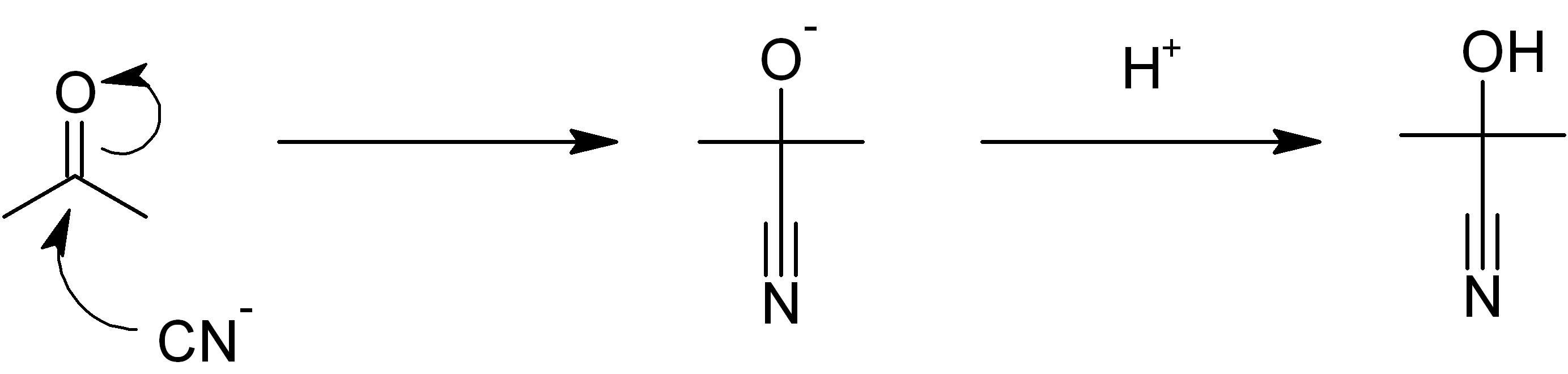

Considering the high human toxicity of this process, a lab scale production has been developed using a microreactor-scale flow chemistry system to avoid needing to manufacture and store large quantities of the reagent. Alternatively, a simplified procedure involves the action of sodium or potassium cyanide on the sodium bisulfite adduct of acetone prepared in situ. This gives a less pure product, one that is nonetheless suitable for most syntheses.

== Reactions ==
Acetone cyanohydrin is an intermediate en route to methyl methacrylate. Treatment with sulfuric acid gives methacrylamide sulfate, methanolysis of which gives ammonium bisulfate and methyl methacrylate.

It is used as a surrogate in place of HCN, as illustrated by its use as a precursor to lithium cyanide:

(CH_{3})_{2}C(OH)CN + LiH → (CH_{3})_{2}CO + LiCN + H_{2}

In transhydrocyanation, an equivalent of HCN is transferred from acetone cyanohydrin to another acceptor, with acetone as byproduct. The transfer is an equilibrium process, initiated by base. The reaction can be driven by trapping reactions or by the use of a superior HCN acceptor, such as an aldehyde. In the hydrocyanation reaction of butadiene, the transfer is irreversible.

== Natural occurrence in cassava ==
Cassava tubers contain linamarin, a glucoside of this compound, alongside the enzyme linamarase which splits the precursor compound linamarin into acetone cyanohydrin and dextrose when the plant is mechanically damaged.

This can pose a risk to human health.

== Safety ==
Acetone cyanohydrin is classified as an extremely hazardous substance in the US Emergency Planning and Community Right-to-Know Act and carries an RCRA P069 waste code. The principal hazards of acetone cyanohydrin arise from rapid decomposition on contact with water, which releases highly toxic hydrogen cyanide vapors.
