= C4H7N =

The molecular formula C_{4}H_{7}N (molar mass: 69.10 g/mol, exact mass: 69.05785 u) may refer to:

- Butyronitrile, or propyl cyanide
- Isopropyl cyanide
- Pyrroline
- 2-Azabicyclo[1.1.1]pentane
