= C4H7NO =

The molecular formula C_{4}H_{7}NO (molar mass: 85.10 g/mol) may refer to:

- Acetone cyanohydrin (ACH)
- Methacrylamide
- 2-Pyrrolidone
- Propyl isocyanate
- N-Vinylacetamide (NVA)
