= Trimethylsilyl cyanide =

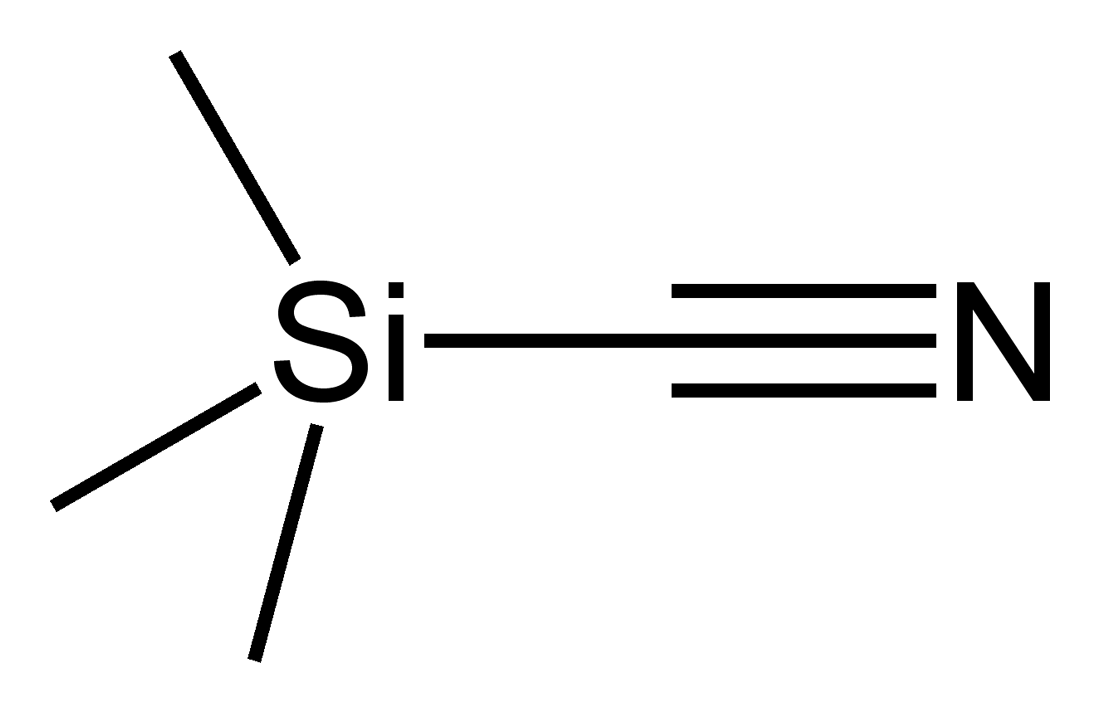

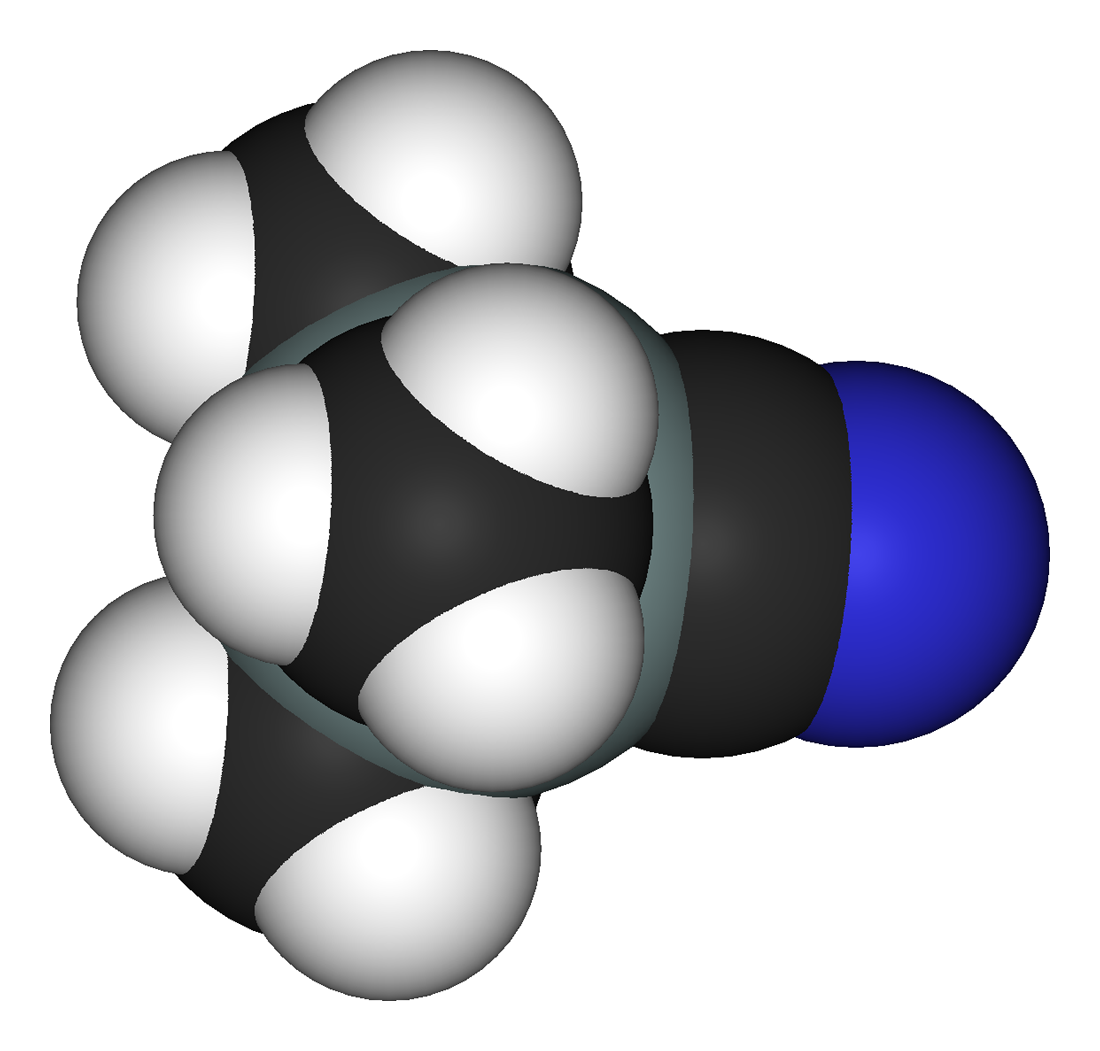

Names
- Preferred IUPAC name Trimethylsilanecarbonitrile
- Other names Cyanotrimethylsilane; TMS cyanide; Trimethylsilylnitrile; Trimethylsilylcarbonitrile; Trimethylsilylformonitrile

Identifiers
| CAS Number | 7677-24-9 |
| 3D model (JSmol) | Interactive image |
| Abbreviations | TMSCN |
| ChemSpider | 74110 |
| ECHA InfoCard | 100.028.780 |
| EC Number | 231-657-3 |
| PubChem CID | 82115 |
| UNII | X7M2DZS7WZ |
| CompTox Dashboard (EPA) | DTXSID9064766 |
- InChI: InChI=1S/C4H9NSi/c1-6(2,3)4-5/h1-3H3 Key: LEIMLDGFXIOXMT-UHFFFAOYSA-N; InChI=1/C4H9NSi/c1-6(2,3)4-5/h1-3H3 Key: LEIMLDGFXIOXMT-UHFFFAOYAM
- SMILES: C[Si](C)(C)C#N

Properties
| Chemical formula | (CH_{3})_{3}SiCN |
| Molar mass | 99.208 g·mol^{−1} |
| Appearance | Colorless liquid |
| Density | 0.793 g/mL at 20 °C |
| Melting point | 8 to 11 °C (46 to 52 °F; 281 to 284 K) |
| Boiling point | 114 to 117 °C (237 to 243 °F; 387 to 390 K) |
| Solubility in water | hydrolyzes |
| Solubility | organic solvents |
| Refractive index (n_{D}) | 1.392 |

Hazards
- Occupational safety and health (OHS/OSH)
| Main hazards | Poisonous |
- GHS labelling
| Pictograms | (GHS02: Flammable) (GHS06: Toxic) (GHS09: Environmental hazard) |
| Signal word | Danger |
| Hazard statements | H225, H300, H310, H330, H410 |
| Precautionary statements | P210, P233, P240, P241, P242, P243, P260, P262, P264, P270, P271, P273, P280, P284, P301+P310, P302+P350, P303+P361+P353, P304+P340, P310, P320, P321, P330, P361, P363, P370+P378, P391, P403+P233, P403+P235, P405, P501 |
| Flash point | 1 °C (34 °F; 274 K) |

Related compounds
| Other anions | Trimethylsilyl chloride |
- Except where otherwise noted, data are given for materials in their standard state (at 25 °C [77 °F], 100 kPa). verify (what is ?) Infobox references

Trimethylsilyl cyanide is the chemical compound with the formula (CH_{3})_{3}SiCN. This volatile colorless liquid consists of a cyanide group, that is CN, attached to a trimethylsilyl group. The molecule is used in organic synthesis as the equivalent of hydrogen cyanide. It is prepared by the reaction of lithium cyanide and trimethylsilyl chloride:

LiCN + (CH_{3})_{3}SiCl → (CH_{3})_{3}SiCN + LiCl

== Structure ==
The molecule exhibits the structure of a nitrile-like compound, having the structural formula (CH_{3})_{3}Si−C≡N. The compound exists in a rapid equilibrium with a small amount of the isomeric isocyanide (CH_{3})_{3}Si−N^{+}≡C^{−}. By contrast, the nearly isostructural tert-butyl nitrile does not readily isomerize to tert-butyl isocyanide. The isocyanide isomer can be stabilized by complexation to metals.

== Reactions ==
Trimethylsilyl cyanide hydrolyzes to give hydrogen cyanide and trimethylsilanol:

(CH_{3})_{3}Si−CN + H_{2}O → (CH_{3})_{3}Si−OH + HCN

In its principal application, it adds across carbon-oxygen double bonds, for example in an aldehyde, to form a new carbon-carbon bond:

RCH=O + (CH_{3})_{3}SiC≡N → N≡C–CHR–OSi(CH_{3})_{3}

The product is an O-silylated cyanohydrin.

One use of this reagent is to convert pyridine-N-oxide into 2-cyanopyridine. This transformation is best done in dichloromethane solution using dimethylcarbamoyl chloride as the activating electrophile. It is possible to use benzoyl chloride but the yields and regioselectivity of the addition of the cyano group are lower.

== Safety ==
Trimethylsilyl cyanide behaves equivalently to hydrogen cyanide, a potent poison. The compound can be disposed of by using a mixture of alkali hydroxide and bleach.
