= Bemegride =

Chemical compound

Clinical data
- Trade names: Megimide, others
- Other names: Methetharimide β,β-methylethylglutarimide
- AHFS/Drugs.com: International Drug Names
- ATC code: R07AB05 (WHO)

Legal status
- Legal status: AU: S4 (Prescription only)

Identifiers
- IUPAC name: 4-ethyl-4-methylpiperidine-2,6-dione
- CAS Number: 64-65-3
- PubChem CID: 2310
- ChemSpider: 2220
- UNII: 57DQA39DO2
- KEGG: D01957
- ChEMBL: ChEMBL1214192
- CompTox Dashboard (EPA): DTXSID0045250
- ECHA InfoCard: 100.000.535

Chemical and physical data
- Formula: C_{8}H_{13}NO_{2}
- Molar mass: 155.197 g·mol^{−1}
- 3D model (JSmol): Interactive image
- Melting point: 127 °C (261 °F)
- SMILES: O=C1NC(=O)CC(CC)(C1)C
- InChI: InChI=1S/C8H13NO2/c1-3-8(2)4-6(10)9-7(11)5-8/h3-5H2,1-2H3,(H,9,10,11); Key:ORRZGUBHBVWWOP-UHFFFAOYSA-N

Bemegride, sold under the brand name Megimide among others, is a central nervous system (CNS) stimulant first manufactured in 1911, and which has been used in hypnotic overdose.

As with other chemoreceptor agonists, it is a potent emetic at doses above those normally used in management of barbiturate overdose, although vomiting and aspiration are a concern during treatment. It is a controlled substance in some countries, and is sometimes used to induce convulsions in experimental animals.

== Synthesis ==
Bemegride synthesis:

The original synthesis involves first the condensation of methylethylketone with two equivalents of cyanoacetamide. The product can be rationalized by assuming first aldol condensation of ketone and active methylene compound followed by dehydration to give 3. Conjugate addition of a second molecule of cyanoacetamide would afford 4. Addition of one of the amide amines to the nitrile would then afford the iminonitrile 5. The observed product 6 can be rationalized by assuming loss of the carboxamide under strongly basic conditions. Decarboxylative hydrolysis of 6 then leads to bemegride 7.

== Society and culture ==
=== John Bodkin Adams case ===
Bemegride was the drug which suspected serial killer John Bodkin Adams who, as a general practitioner, failed to prescribe correctly to his patient Gertrude Hullett. Hullett took an overdose of barbiturates on 19 July 1956, but Adams only gave her a single 10cc dose of bemegride three days later on the 22nd, despite having acquired 100cc for her treatment. Hullett died the next day on 23 July 1956. Adams was charged but never tried for her murder.
