= Malononitrile =

Organic compound with formula CH2(CN)2

- Skeletal formula of malononitrile

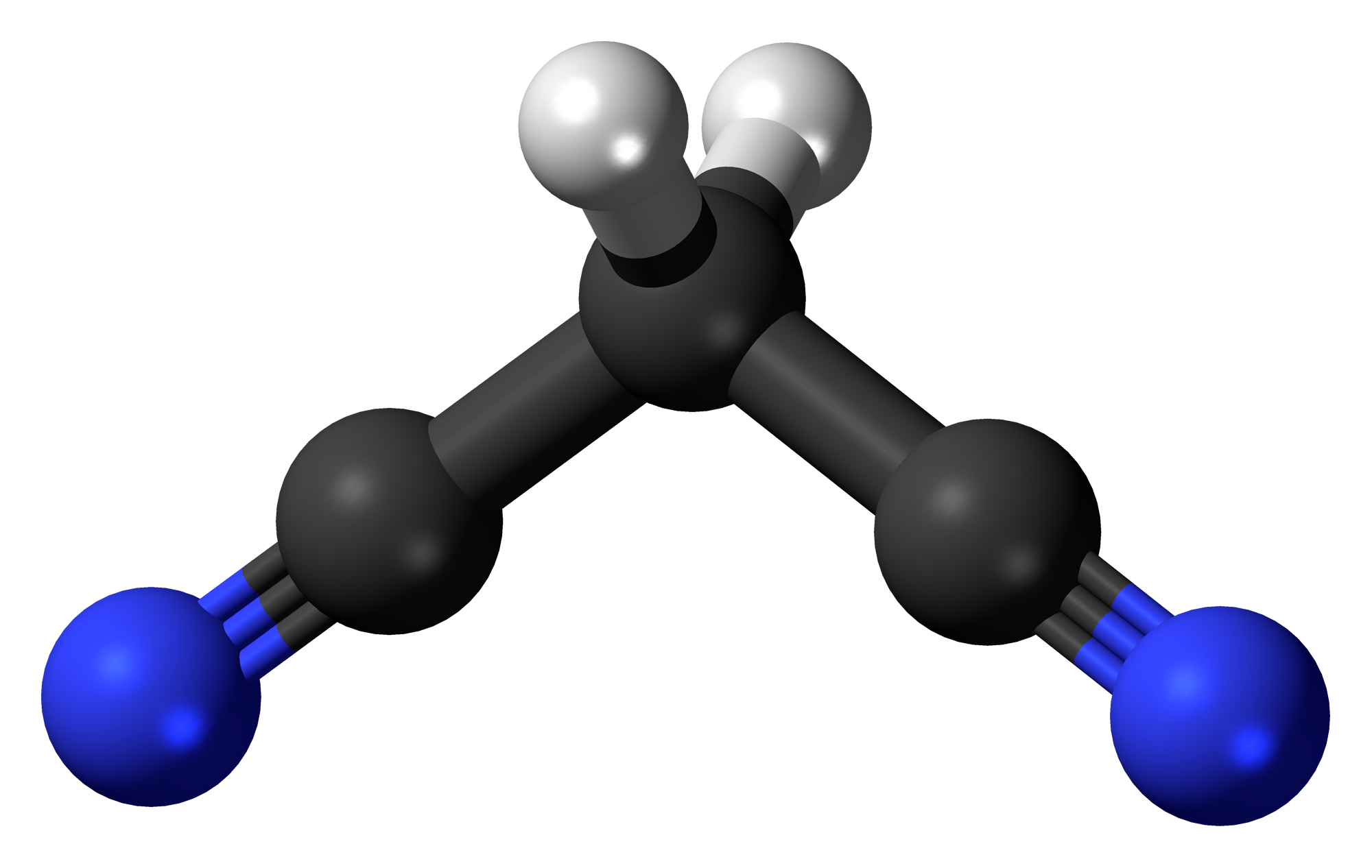
Ball-and-stick model
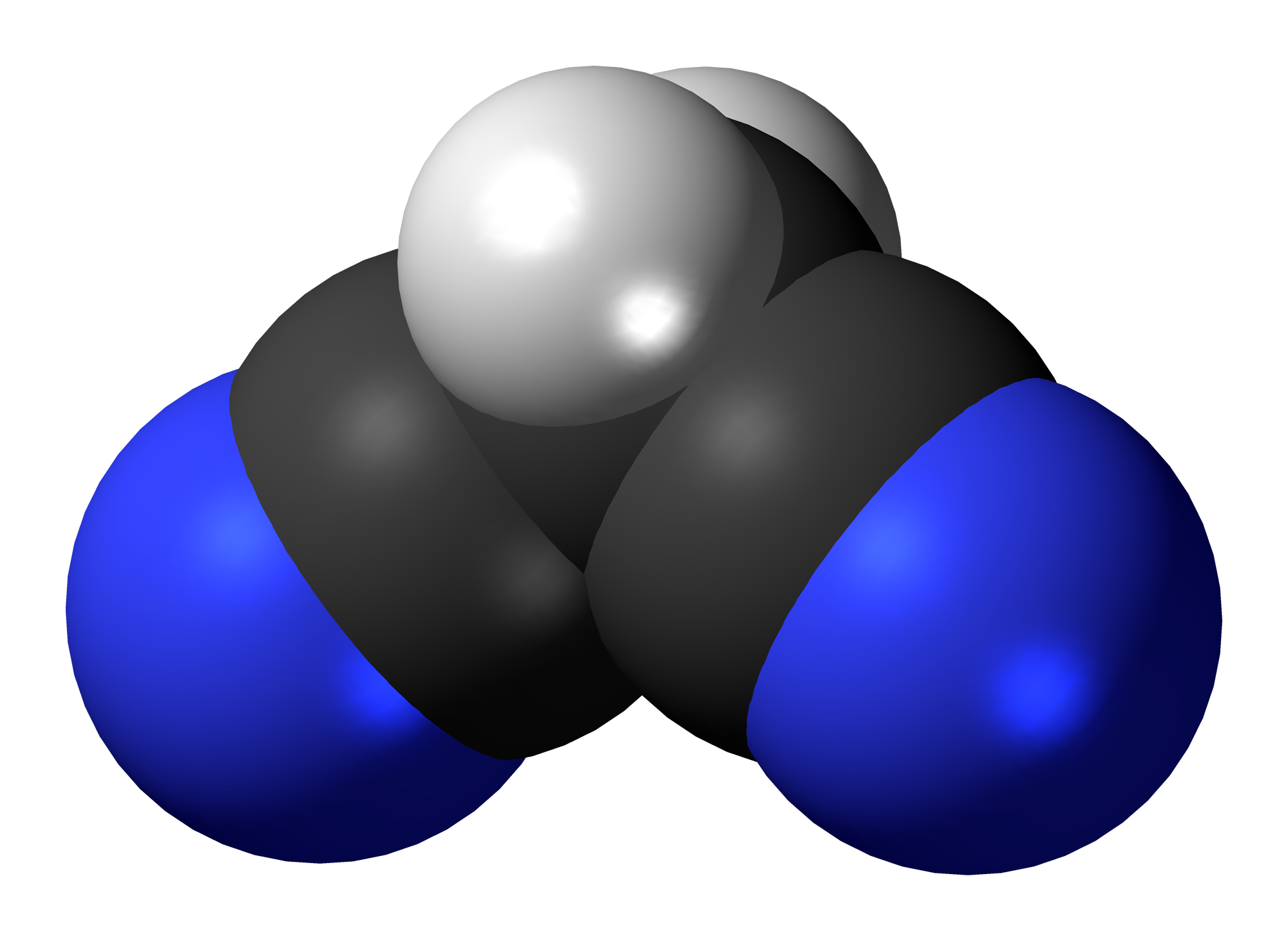
Space-filling model

Names
- IUPAC name Malononitrile
- Preferred IUPAC name Propanedinitrile
- Other names: Malonodinitrile; Cyanoacetonitrile; Dicyanomethane; Malonic dinitrile

Identifiers
| CAS Number | 109-77-3 |
| 3D model (JSmol) | Interactive image |
| Beilstein Reference | 773697 |
| ChEBI | CHEBI:33186 |
| ChemSpider | 13884495 |
| ECHA InfoCard | 100.003.368 |
| EC Number | 203-703-2 |
| Gmelin Reference | 1303 |
| MeSH | dicyanmethane |
| PubChem CID | 8010 |
| RTECS number | OO3150000 |
| UNII | EBL1KKS93J |
| UN number | 2647 |
| CompTox Dashboard (EPA) | DTXSID6021907 |
- InChI: InChI=1S/C3H2N2/c4-2-1-3-5/h1H2 Key: CUONGYYJJVDODC-UHFFFAOYSA-N
- SMILES: N#CCC#N

Properties
| Chemical formula | CH_{2}(CN)_{2} |
| Molar mass | 66.063 g·mol^{−1} |
| Appearance | Colourless or white solid |
| Odor | Sweet |
| Density | 1.049 g/cm^{3} |
| Melting point | 30–32 °C (86–90 °F; 303–305 K) |
| Boiling point | 220 °C (428 °F; 493 K) |
| Solubility in water | 133 g/L (20 °C (68 °F; 293 K)) |

Thermochemistry
| Heat capacity (C) | 110.29 J⋅K^{−1}⋅mol^{-1} |
| Std molar entropy (S^{⦵}_{298}) | 130.96 J⋅K^{−1}⋅mol^{-1} |
| Std enthalpy of formation (Δ_{f}H^{⦵}_{298}) | 187.7 to 188.1 kJ⋅mol^{−1} |
| Std enthalpy of combustion (Δ_{c}H^{⦵}_{298}) | −1654.0 to −1654.4 kJ⋅mol^{−1} |

Hazards
- GHS labelling
| Pictograms | (GHS06: Toxic) (GHS07: Exclamation mark) (GHS09: Environmental hazard) |
| Signal word | Danger |
| Hazard statements | H300, H311+H331, H317, H319, H410 |
| Precautionary statements | P261, P264, P270, P271, P272, P273, P280, P301+P310+P330, P302+P352+P312, P304+P340+P311, P305+P351+P338, P333+P313, P337+P313, P362, P391, P403+P233, P405, P501 |
| NFPA 704 (fire diamond) | 4 1 1 |
| Flash point | 86 °C (187 °F; 359 K) |
| Autoignition temperature | 365 °C (689 °F; 638 K) |
- Lethal dose or concentration (LD, LC)
| LD_{50} (median dose) | 19 mg/kg (oral, mouse); 14 mg/kg (oral, rat); 350 mg/kg (dermal, rat) |
| LC_{50} (median concentration) | 0.51 mg/L (inhalation, dust/mist, 4h) |
- NIOSH (US health exposure limits)
| PEL (Permissible) | none |
| REL (Recommended) | TWA 3 ppm (8 mg/m^{3}) |
| IDLH (Immediate danger) | N.D. |

Related compounds
| Related alkanenitriles | Acetonitrile; Aminoacetonitrile; Glycolonitrile; Cyanogen; Propanenitrile; Aminopropionitrile; Pivalonitrile; Acetone cyanohydrin; Butyronitrile; Succinonitrile; Tetramethylsuccinonitrile |
| Related compounds | Malonic acid |
- Except where otherwise noted, data are given for materials in their standard state (at 25 °C [77 °F], 100 kPa). Infobox references

Malononitrile is an organic compound nitrile with the formula CH_{2}(CN)_{2}. It is a colorless or white solid, although aged samples appear yellow or even brown. It is a widely used building block in organic synthesis.

== Preparation and reactions ==
It can be prepared by dehydration of cyanoacetamide. Most commonly malononitrile is produced by the gas-phase reaction of acetonitrile and cyanogen chloride:

NCCl + CH_{3}CN → NCCH_{2}CN + HCl

About 20,000,000 kilograms (20,000 LT) are produced annually (2007). Important outlets include the synthesis of thiamine, the drug triamterene and minoxidil, and the dyes disperse Yellow 90 and disperse Blue 354.

Malononitrile is relatively acidic, with a pK_{a} of 11 in water. This allows it to be used in the Knoevenagel condensation, for example in the preparation of CS gas:

CS-chemical-synthesis

Despite its relative obscurity, malononitrile is very useful in several reactions, the prime example being a suitable starting reagent for the Gewald reaction, where the nitrile condenses with a ketone or aldehyde in the presence of elemental sulfur and a base to produce a 2-aminothiophene. It can also be used as a Michael donor.

== Interstellar occurrence ==
Due to its permanent dipole moment (i.e., 3.735 ± 0.017 D), malononitrile was detected in spectral emissions coming from interstellar cloud TMC-1 through the QUIJOTE line survey conducted with the Yebes 40 m radio telescope.
