= Succinonitrile =

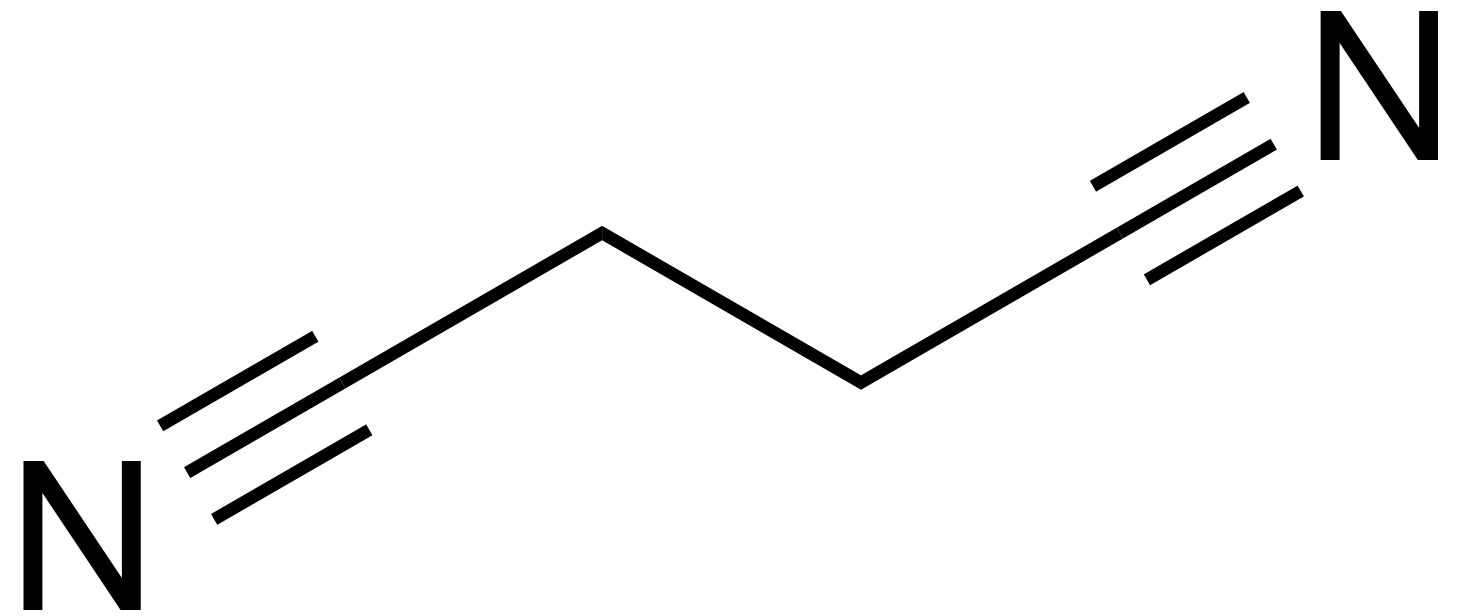
- Skeletal formula of succinonitrile

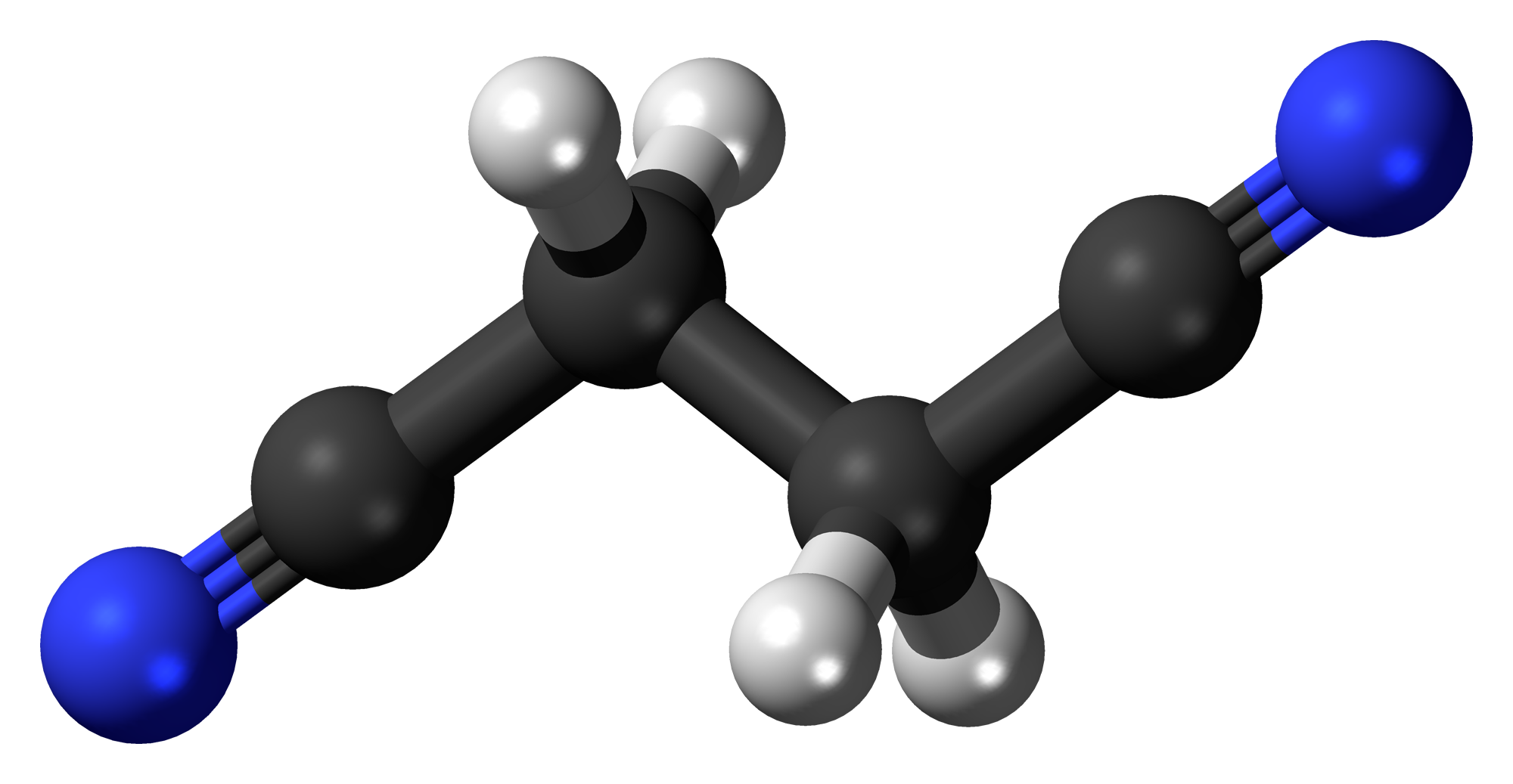
Ball and stick model of succinonitrile
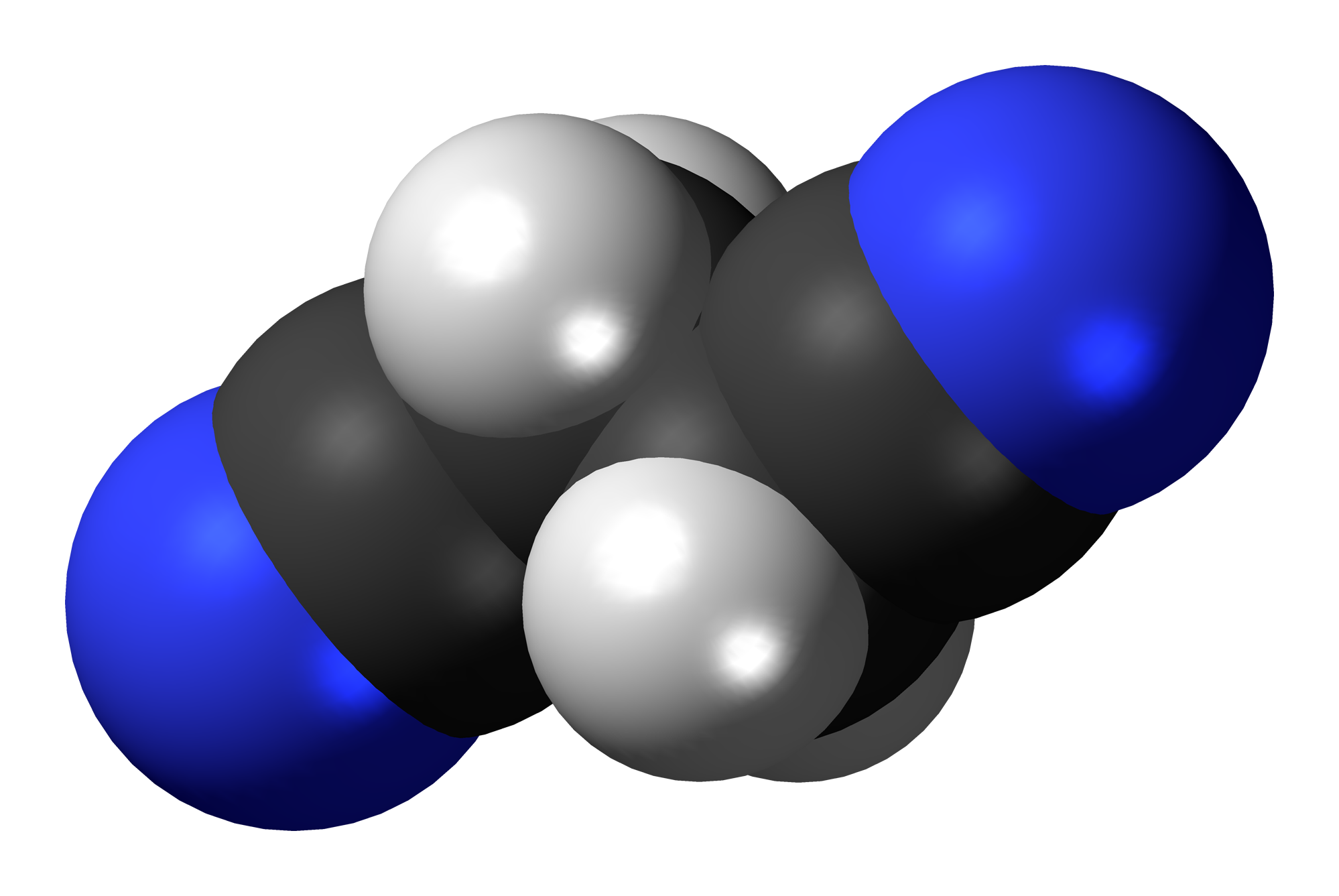
Spacefill model of succinonitrile

Names
- Preferred IUPAC name Butanedinitrile
- Other names: Deprelin; Dicyanoethane; Ethylene cyanide

Identifiers
CAS Number	110-61-2
3D model (JSmol)	Interactive image
Beilstein Reference	1098380
ChemSpider	21106481
ECHA InfoCard	100.003.441
EC Number	203-783-9
MeSH	succinonitrile
PubChem CID	8062
RTECS number	WN3850000
UNII	1R479O92DO
CompTox Dashboard (EPA)	DTXSID9026059
- InChI: InChI=1S/C4H4N2/c5-3-1-2-4-6/h1-2H2 Key: IAHFWCOBPZCAEA-UHFFFAOYSA-N
- SMILES: N#CCCC#N

Properties
Chemical formula	C_{4}H_{4}N_{2}
Molar mass	80.090 g·mol^{−1}
Appearance	Colorless, waxy crystals
Odor	odorless
Density	985 mg mL^{−1}
Melting point	58 °C (136 °F; 331 K)
Boiling point	266.1 °C; 510.9 °F; 539.2 K
Solubility in water	130 g L^{−1}
Vapor pressure	300 Pa (at 100 °C)

Thermochemistry
Heat capacity (C)	145.60 J K^{−1} mol^{−1}
Std molar entropy (S^{⦵}_{298})	191.59 J K^{−1} mol^{−1}
Std enthalpy of formation (Δ_{f}H^{⦵}_{298})	139.3–140.4 kJ mol^{−1}
Std enthalpy of combustion (Δ_{c}H^{⦵}_{298})	−2.2848–−2.2860 MJ mol^{−1}

Hazards
- GHS labelling
Pictograms	(GHS07: Exclamation mark)
Signal word	Warning
Hazard statements	H302, H315, H319, H335
Precautionary statements	P261, P305+P351+P338
Flash point	113 °C (235 °F; 386 K)
- Lethal dose or concentration (LD, LC)
LD_{50} (median dose)	450 mg kg^{−1} (oral, rat)
- NIOSH (US health exposure limits)
PEL (Permissible)	none
REL (Recommended)	TWA 6 ppm (20 mg/m^{3})
IDLH (Immediate danger)	N.D.

Related compounds
Related alkanenitriles	Propanenitrile; Aminopropionitrile; Pivalonitrile; Acetone cyanohydrin; Butyronitrile; Tetramethylsuccinonitrile
Related compounds	DBNPA
- Except where otherwise noted, data are given for materials in their standard state (at 25 °C [77 °F], 100 kPa). verify (what is ?) Infobox references

Succinonitrile, also butanedinitrile, is a nitrile, with the formula of C_{2}H_{4}(CN)_{2}. It is an odorless, colorless to light brown crystal or colourless waxy solid which melts at 58 °C.

Succinonitrile is produced by the addition of hydrogen cyanide to acrylonitrile (hydrocyanation):

CH_{2}=CHCN + HCN → NCCH_{2}CH_{2}CN

Hydrogenation of succinonitrile yields putrescine (1,4-diaminobutane).

== Applications ==
Succinonitrile may find applications as the "solvent" (while still in its waxy state) in lithium batteries.

== Safety ==
Like most nitriles, succinonitrile is toxic and can release cyanide ions in the body. NIOSH recommends a TWA exposure limit of 6 ppm (20 mg/m³).

== See also ==
- Malononitrile - A di-nitrile with 3 carbon atoms
- Glutaronitrile - A di-nitrile with 5 carbon atoms
- Adiponitrile - A di-nitrile with 6 carbon atoms
