= 2-MDP =

Chemical compound

Identifiers
- IUPAC name: 3-amino-2-methyl-1,1-di(phenyl)propan-1-ol
- CAS Number: 14326-31-9; HCl: 14185-05-8
- PubChem CID: 26538
- ChemSpider: 24719
- UNII: B6FTK35FGC; HCl: TJH732RKT9
- CompTox Dashboard (EPA): DTXSID90912320

Chemical and physical data
- Formula: C_{16}H_{19}NO
- Molar mass: 241.334 g·mol^{−1}
- 3D model (JSmol): Interactive image
- SMILES: OC(c1ccccc1)(c2ccccc2)C(C)CN
- InChI: InChI=1S/C16H19NO/c1-13(12-17)16(18,14-8-4-2-5-9-14)15-10-6-3-7-11-15/h2-11,13,18H,12,17H2,1H3; Key:XGYCHIPEPHYUIH-UHFFFAOYSA-N

2-MDP (U-23807A) is a dissociative anaesthetic drug which has been found to be an NMDA antagonist and produces similar effects to PCP in animals. The levo or (−)-isomer is the active form of the drug. It also has stimulant effects, having only around one third the potency of amphetamine by weight, but with a long duration of action, lasting more than 24 hours from a single oral dose.

== Effects ==
The therapeutic action is said to exhibit appetite suppressant- and antidepressant-like activity.

== Synthesis ==
2-MDP synthesis

In a variation of the nitrile-aldol reaction, combination of benzophenone (1) and propionitrile (2), in the presence of sodamide base and ethyl ether solvent, leads to 3-hydroxy-2-methyl-3,3-diphenylpropanenitrile (3). The reduction of the intermediate nitrile group with lithium aluminium hydride completes the synthesis of 2-MDP (4).
