= Glutaronitrile =

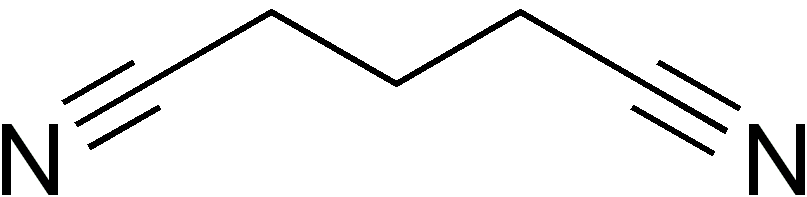
- Structural formula of glutoronitrile

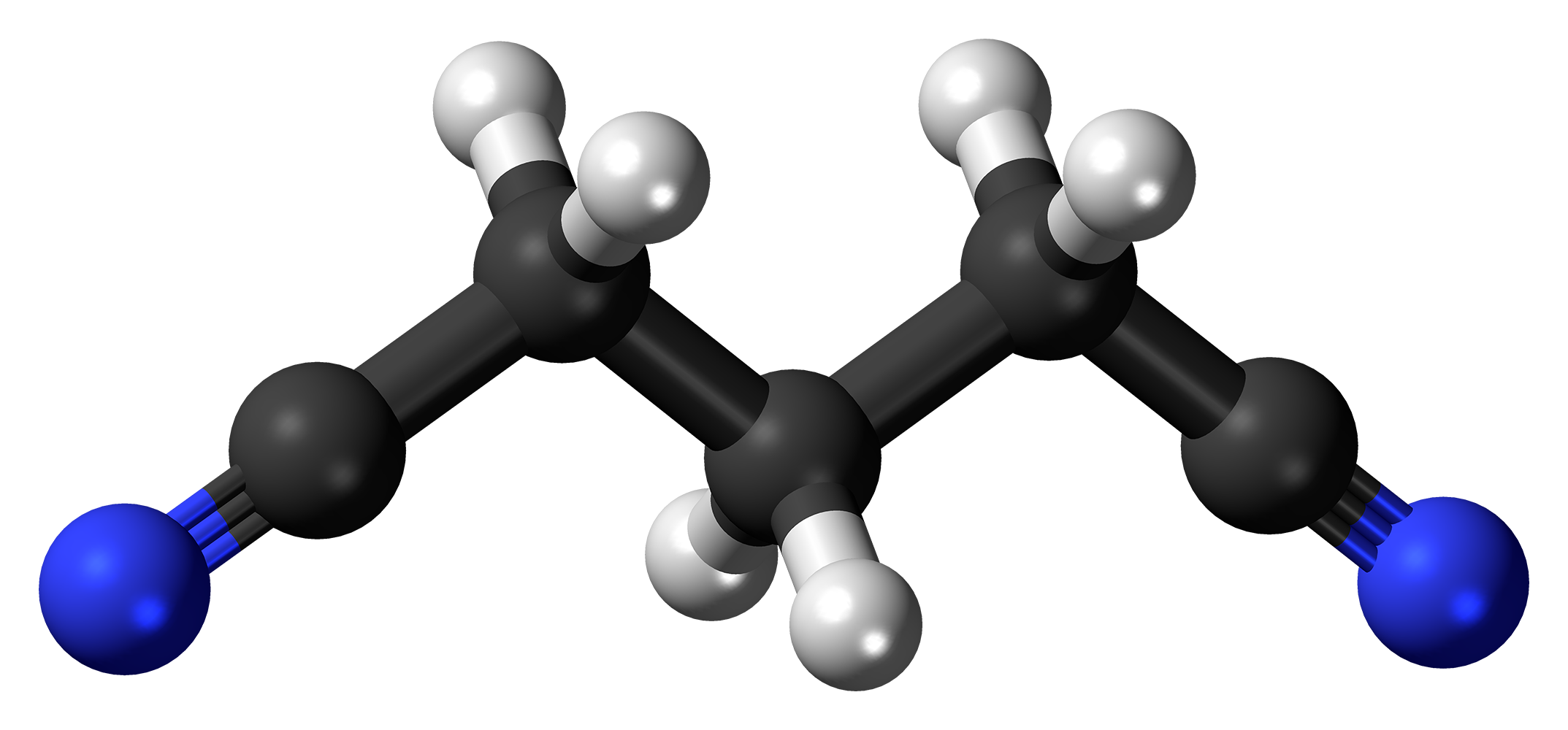

Names
- Preferred IUPAC name Pentanedinitrile
- Other names Dicyanopropane

Identifiers
| CAS Number | 544-13-8 |
| 3D model (JSmol) | Interactive image |
| Beilstein Reference | 1738385 |
| ChemSpider | 21106442 |
| ECHA InfoCard | 100.008.056 |
| EC Number | 208-861-6 |
| PubChem CID | 10994 |
| RTECS number | YI3500000 |
| UNII | 01ZI68F3CQ |
| UN number | 2810 |
| CompTox Dashboard (EPA) | DTXSID6060266 |
- InChI: InChI=1S/C5H6N2/c6-4-2-1-3-5-7/h1-3H2 Key: ZTOMUSMDRMJOTH-UHFFFAOYSA-N
- SMILES: N#CCCCC#N

Properties
| Chemical formula | C_{5}H_{6}N_{2} |
| Molar mass | 94.117 g·mol^{−1} |
| Appearance | Colourless liquid |
| Density | 995 mg mL^{−1} |
| Melting point | −29.6 °C; −21.2 °F; 243.6 K |
| Boiling point | 286.1 °C; 546.9 °F; 559.2 K |
| Refractive index (n_{D}) | 1.434 |

Thermochemistry
| Heat capacity (C) | 186.26 J K^{−1} mol^{−1} |
| Std molar entropy (S^{⦵}_{298}) | 239.45 J K^{−1} mol^{−1} |

Hazards
- GHS labelling
| Pictograms | (GHS06: Toxic) |
| Signal word | Danger |
| Hazard statements | H301, H312, H332 |
| Precautionary statements | P280, P301+P310 |
| Flash point | 113 °C (235 °F; 386 K) |
- Lethal dose or concentration (LD, LC)
| LD_{50} (median dose) | 266 mg kg^{−1} (oral, mouse) |

Related compounds
| Related alkanenitriles | Butyronitrile; Succinonitrile; Tetramethylsuccinonitrile; Adiponitrile |
- Except where otherwise noted, data are given for materials in their standard state (at 25 °C [77 °F], 100 kPa). verify (what is ?) Infobox references

Glutaronitrile, also pentanedinitrile, is a nitrile, with formula C_{3}H_{6}(CN)_{2}.
