= Pivalonitrile =

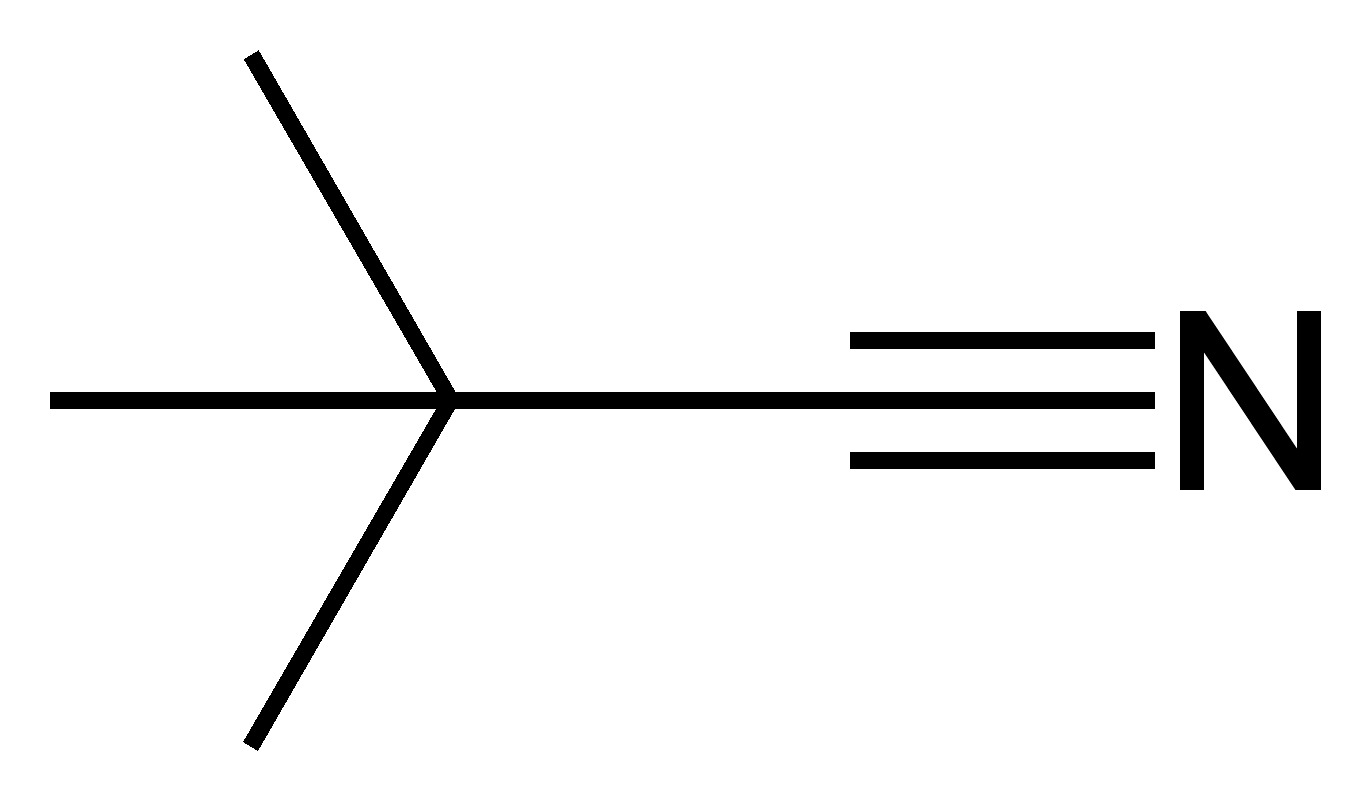
- Skeletal formula of pivalonitrile

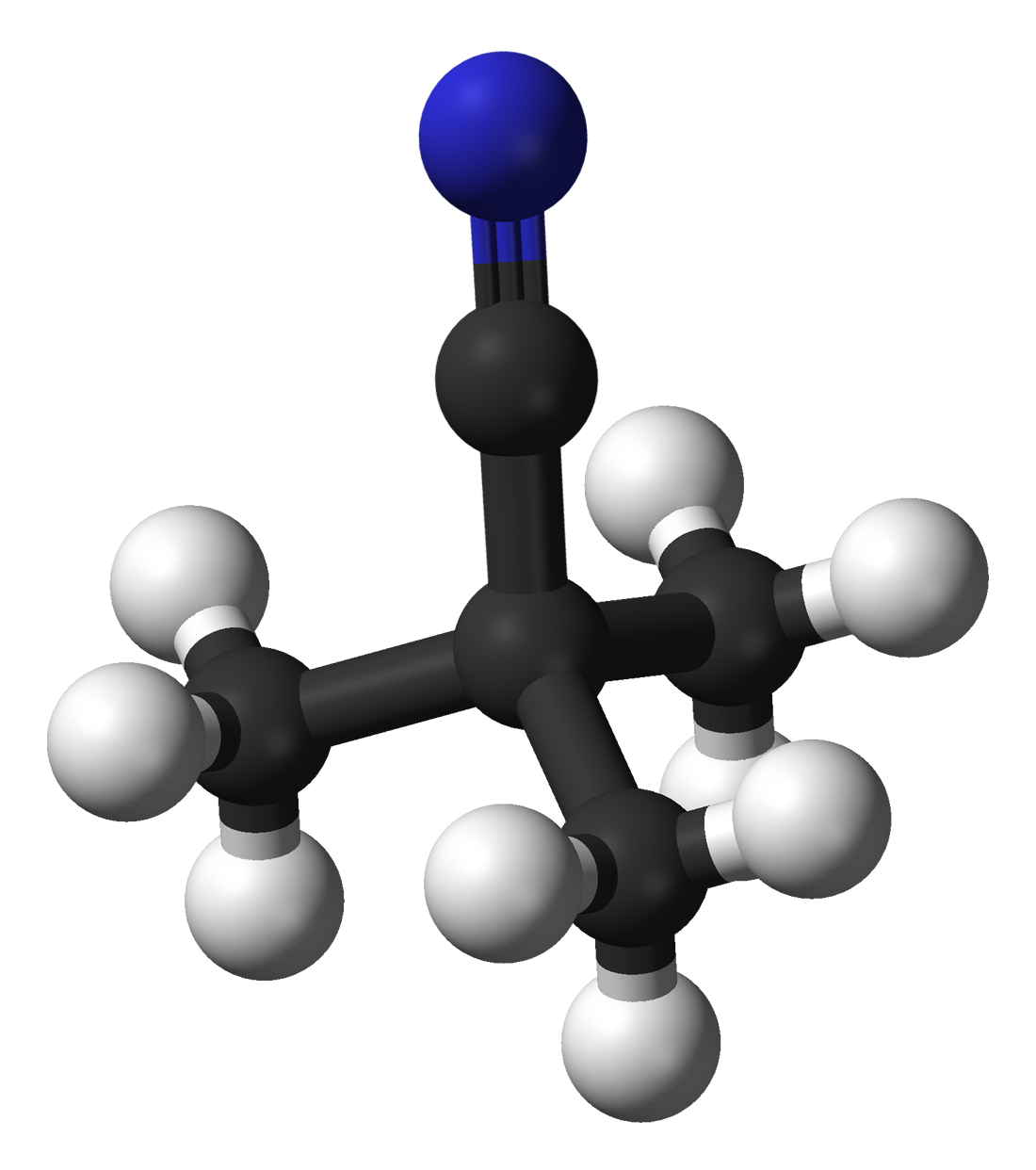
- Ball and stick model of pivalonitrile

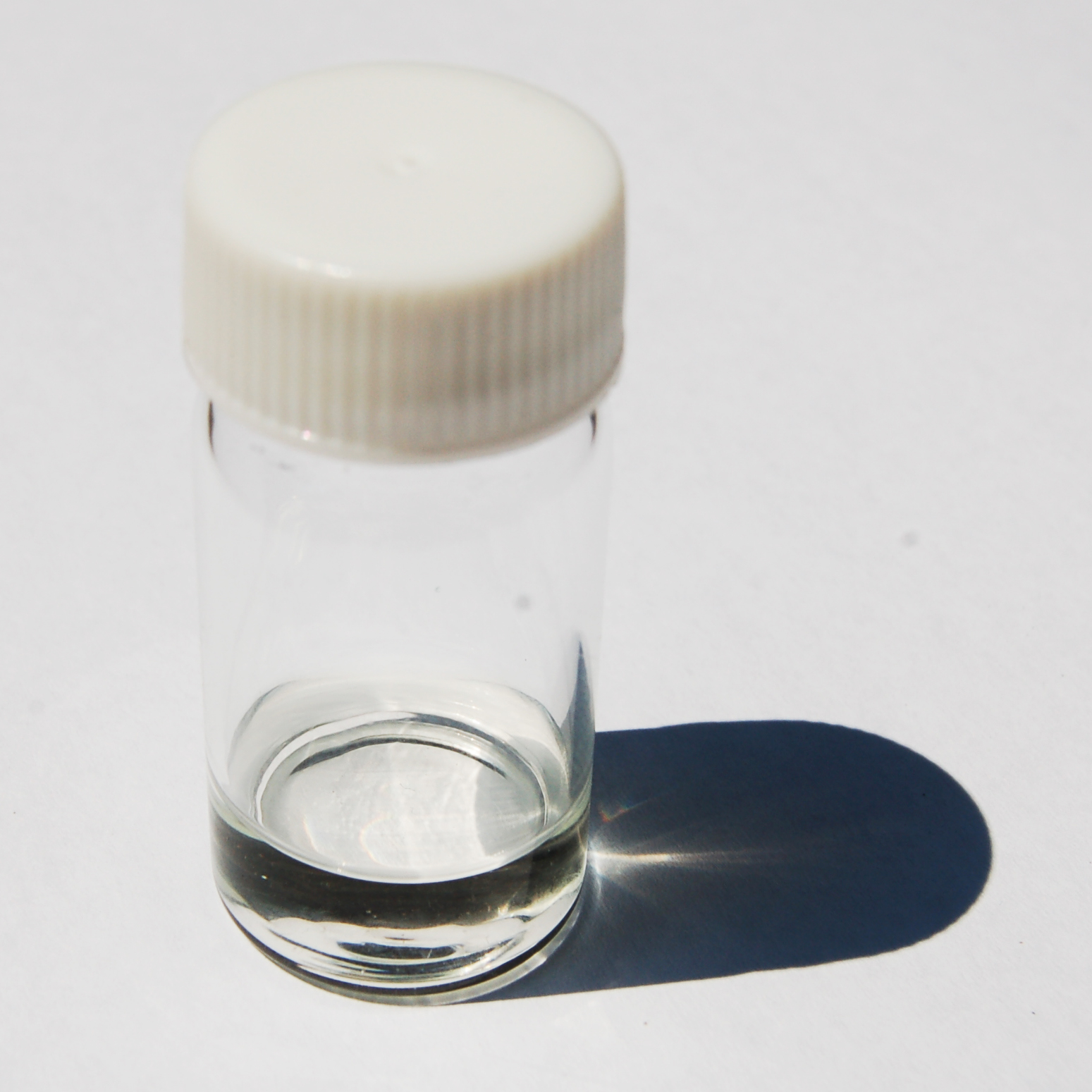
- Sample of pivalonitrile in a vial

Names
- Preferred IUPAC name 2,2-Dimethylpropanenitrile
- Other names: tert-Butyl cyanide; tert-Cyanobutane; 2-Cyano-2-methylpropane; Trimethylacetonitrile; tert-Butylnitrile

Identifiers
CAS Number	630-18-2
3D model (JSmol)	Interactive image
Beilstein Reference	1361449
ChemSpider	11909
ECHA InfoCard	100.010.122
EC Number	211-133-0
PubChem CID	12416
UNII	AQD7ZXJ3PR
UN number	3273
CompTox Dashboard (EPA)	DTXSID7060887
- InChI: InChI=1S/C5H9N/c1-5(2,3)4-6/h1-3H3 Key: JAMNHZBIQDNHMM-UHFFFAOYSA-N
- SMILES: CC(C)(C)C#N

Properties
Chemical formula	C_{5}H_{9}N
Molar mass	83.134 g·mol^{−1}
Appearance	Colourless liquid
Density	752 mg mL^{−1}
Melting point	15 °C (59 °F; 288 K)
Boiling point	106 °C (223 °F; 379 K)
Refractive index (n_{D})	1.3774

Thermochemistry
Heat capacity (C)	179.37 J K^{−1} mol^{−1}
Std molar entropy (S^{⦵}_{298})	232.00 J K^{−1} mol^{−1}
Std enthalpy of formation (Δ_{f}H^{⦵}_{298})	−39.9 kJ mol^{−1}
Std enthalpy of combustion (Δ_{c}H^{⦵}_{298})	−3.2146–−3.2132 MJ mol^{−1}

Hazards
- GHS labelling
Pictograms	(GHS02: Flammable) (GHS06: Toxic)
Signal word	Danger
Hazard statements	H225, H301, H311, H331
Precautionary statements	P210, P261, P280, P301+P310, P311
Flash point	4 °C (39 °F; 277 K)

Related compounds
Related alkanenitriles	Acetonitrile; Aminoacetonitrile; Glycolonitrile; Cyanogen; Propanenitrile; Aminopropionitrile; Malononitrile; Acetone cyanohydrin; Butyronitrile; Succinonitrile; Tetramethylsuccinonitrile
Related compounds	DBNPA
- Except where otherwise noted, data are given for materials in their standard state (at 25 °C [77 °F], 100 kPa). verify (what is ?) Infobox references

Pivalonitrile is a nitrile with the semi-structural formula (CH_{3})_{3}CCN, abbreviated t-BuCN. This aliphatic organic compound is a clear, colourless liquid that is used as a solvent and as a labile ligand in coordination chemistry. Pivalonitrile is isomeric with tert-butyl isocyanide but the two compounds do not exist in chemical equilibrium, unlike its silicon analog trimethylsilyl cyanide.
