= Propionitrile =

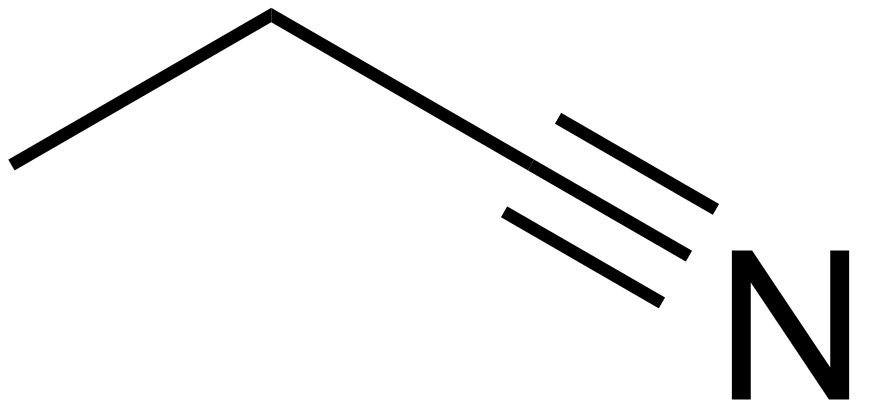
Skeletal formula of propanenitrile
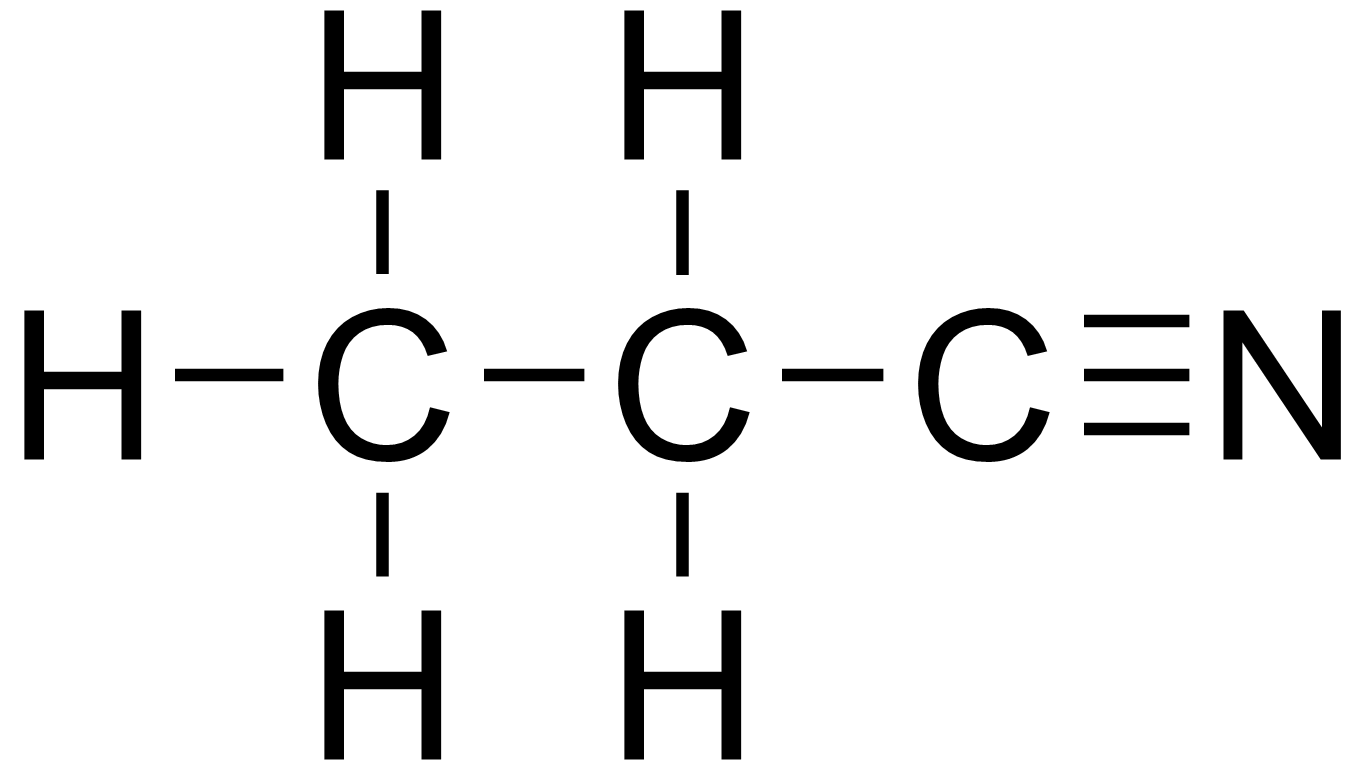
Skeletal formula of propanenitrile with all explicit hydrogens added
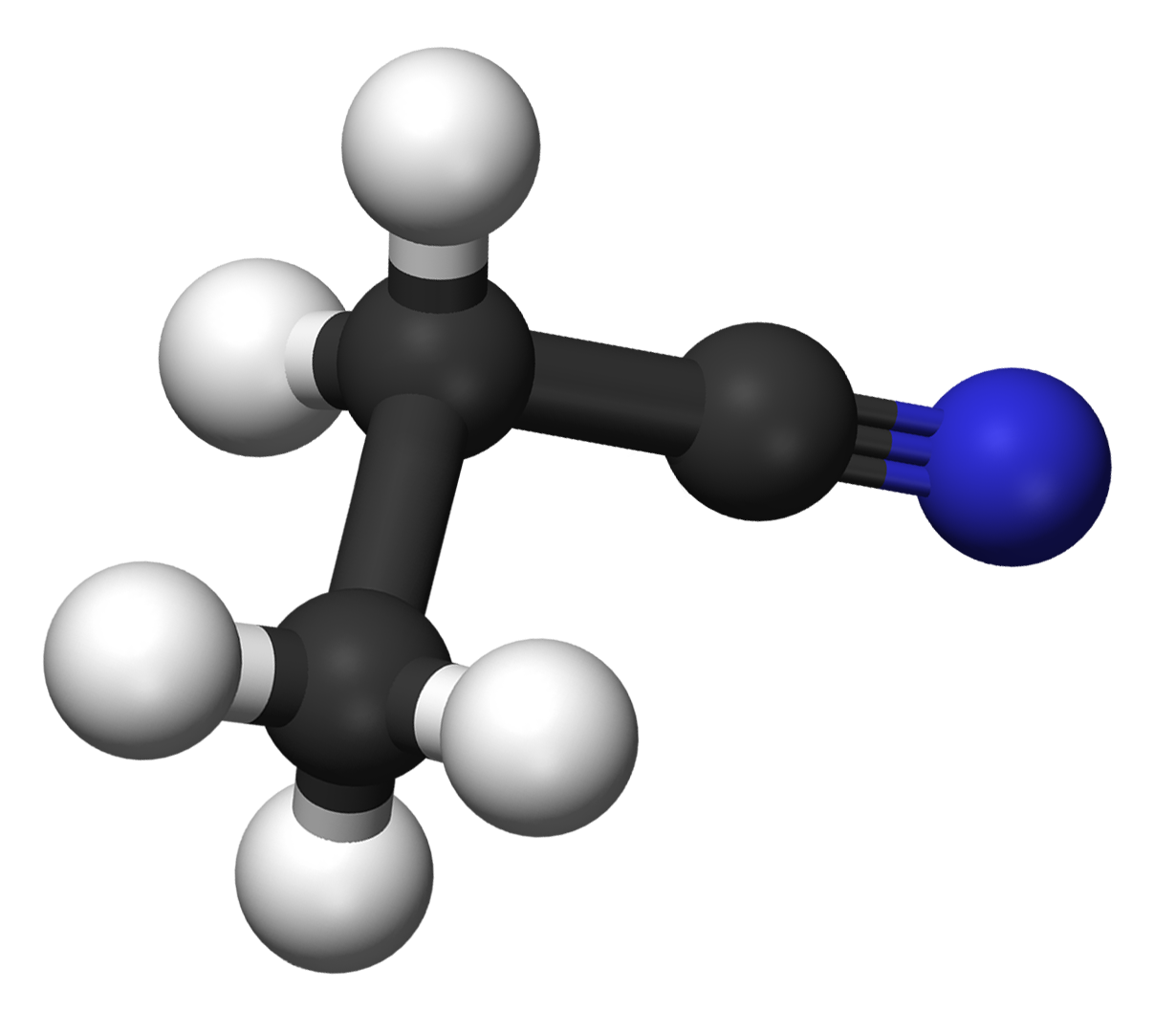
- Ball and stick model of propanenitrile

Names
- Preferred IUPAC name Propanenitrile
- Other names: Cyanoethane; Ethyl cyanide; Propionitrile; Propylnitrile

Identifiers
CAS Number	107-12-0
3D model (JSmol)	Interactive image
Beilstein Reference	773680
ChEBI	CHEBI:26307
ChEMBL	ChEMBL15871
ChemSpider	7566
ECHA InfoCard	100.003.151
EC Number	203-464-4
MeSH	propionitrile
PubChem CID	7854
RTECS number	UF9625000
UNII	E16N05FX3S
UN number	2404
CompTox Dashboard (EPA)	DTXSID1021879
- InChI: InChI=1S/C3H5N/c1-2-3-4/h2H2,1H3 Key: FVSKHRXBFJPNKK-UHFFFAOYSA-N
- SMILES: CCC#N

Properties
Chemical formula	C_{3}H_{5}N
Molar mass	55.080 g·mol^{−1}
Appearance	Colourless liquid
Odor	Sweetish, pleasant, ethereal
Density	772 mg mL^{−1}
Melting point	−100 to −86 °C; −148 to −123 °F; 173 to 187 K
Boiling point	96 to 98 °C; 205 to 208 °F; 369 to 371 K
Solubility in water	11.9% (20 °C)
log P	0.176
Vapor pressure	270 μmol Pa^{−1} kg^{−1}
Magnetic susceptibility (χ)	−38.5·10^{−6} cm^{3}/mol
Refractive index (n_{D})	1.366

Thermochemistry
Heat capacity (C)	105.3 J K^{−1} mol^{−1}
Std molar entropy (S^{⦵}_{298})	189.33 J K^{−1} mol^{−1}
Std enthalpy of formation (Δ_{f}H^{⦵}_{298})	15.5 kJ mol^{−1}
Std enthalpy of combustion (Δ_{c}H^{⦵}_{298})	−1.94884–−1.94776 MJ mol^{−1}

Hazards
- GHS labelling
Pictograms	(GHS02: Flammable) (GHS06: Toxic)
Signal word	Danger
Hazard statements	H225, H300, H310, H319, H332
Precautionary statements	P210, P264, P280, P301+P310, P302+P350, P305+P351+P338
NFPA 704 (fire diamond)	4 3 0
Flash point	6 °C (43 °F; 279 K)
Explosive limits	3.1%-?
- Lethal dose or concentration (LD, LC)
LD_{50} (median dose)	39 mg kg^{−1} (oral, rat)
- NIOSH (US health exposure limits)
PEL (Permissible)	none
REL (Recommended)	TWA 6 ppm (14 mg/m^{3})
IDLH (Immediate danger)	N.D.

Related compounds
Related alkanenitriles	Acetonitrile; Aminopropionitrile; Malononitrile; Pivalonitrile; Butyronitrile; Succinonitrile
Related compounds	DBNPA
- Except where otherwise noted, data are given for materials in their standard state (at 25 °C [77 °F], 100 kPa). verify (what is ?) Infobox references

Propionitrile, also known as ethyl cyanide and propanenitrile, is an organic compound with the formula CH_{3}CH_{2}CN. It is a simple aliphatic nitrile. The compound is a colourless, water-soluble liquid. It is used as a solvent and a precursor to other organic compounds.

== Production ==
The main industrial route to this nitrile is the hydrogenation of acrylonitrile. It is also prepared by the ammoxidation of propanol (propionaldehyde can also be used instead):

CH_{3}CH_{2}CH_{2}OH + O_{2} + NH_{3} → CH_{3}CH_{2}C≡N + 3 H_{2}O

Propionitrile is a byproduct of the electrodimerisation of acrylonitrile to adiponitrile.

In the laboratory propanenitrile can also be produced by the dehydration of propionamide, by catalytic reduction of acrylonitrile, or by distilling ethyl sulfate and potassium cyanide.

== Applications ==
Propionitrile is a solvent similar to acetonitrile but with a slightly higher boiling point. It is a precursor to propylamines by hydrogenation. It is a C-3 building block in the preparation of the drug flopropione by the Houben-Hoesch reaction.

The nitrile aldol reaction with benzophenone, followed by reduction of the nitrile with lithium aluminium hydride gives 2-MDP. This agent possesses appetite suppressant and antidepressant properties.

Chemical structure of 2-MDP

== Safety ==
The toxicity LD_{50} of propionitrile is listed as 39 mg/kg and as 230 my (both rats, oral).

In 1979, the Kalama (Vega) plant in Beaufort, South Carolina experienced an explosion during the production of propionitrile by nickel-catalyzed hydrogenation of acrylonitrile. This site is now one of the two Superfund cleanup sites in South Carolina.
