= Tert-Butyl isocyanide =

tert-Butyl isocyanide
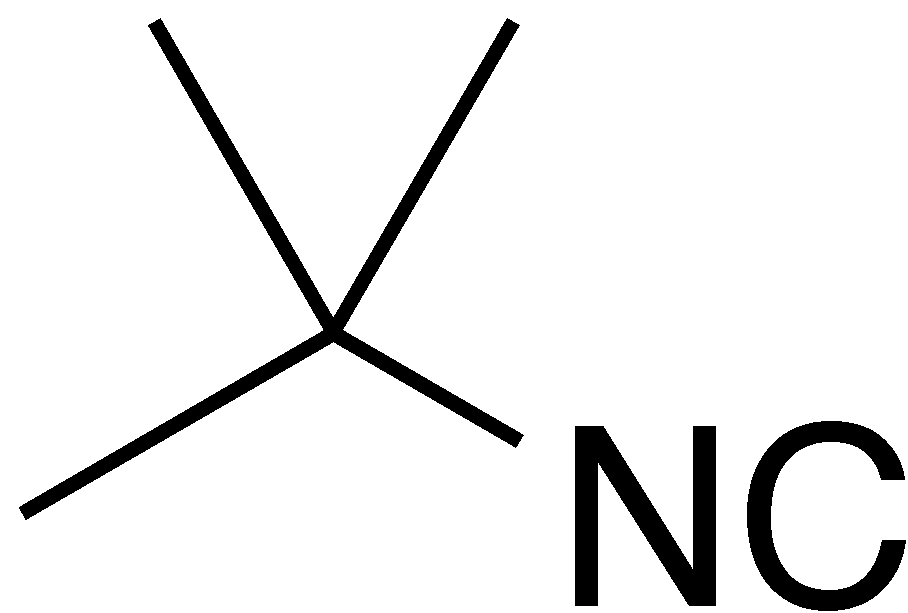

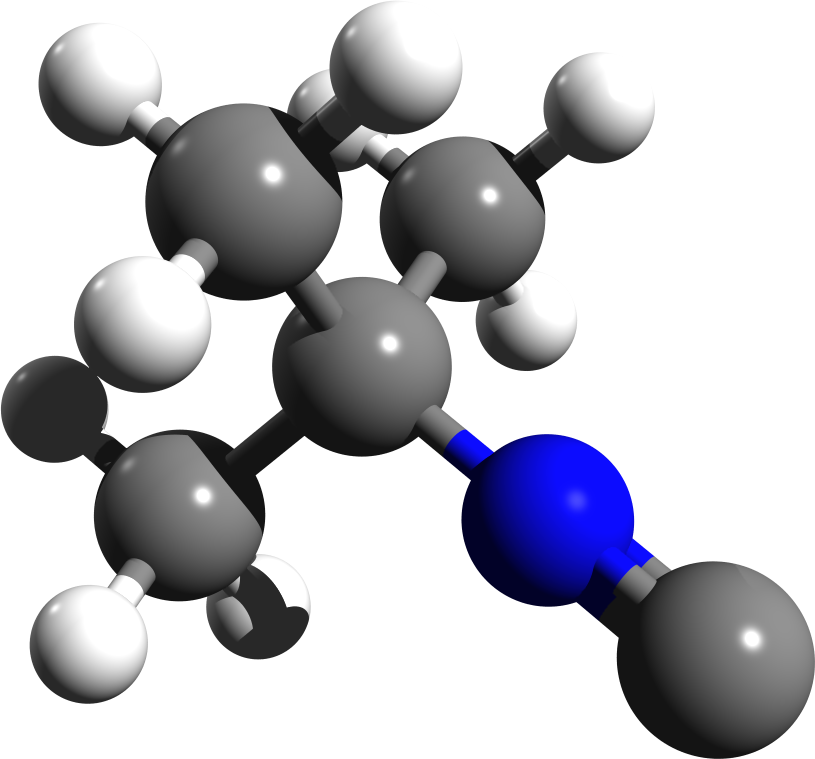

Names
- Preferred IUPAC name 2-Isocyano-2-methylpropane
- Other names t-BuNC

Identifiers
CAS Number	7188-38-7
3D model (JSmol)	Interactive image
ChemSpider	22045
ECHA InfoCard	100.027.776
PubChem CID	23577
UNII	22S4Z857K3
CompTox Dashboard (EPA)	DTXSID60222145
- InChI: InChI=1S/C5H9N/c1-5(2,3)6-4/h1-3H3 Key: FAGLEPBREOXSAC-UHFFFAOYSA-N; InChI=1/C5H9N/c1-5(2,3)6-4/h1-3H3 Key: FAGLEPBREOXSAC-UHFFFAOYAL
- SMILES: CC(C)(C)[N+]#[C-]

Properties
Chemical formula	C_{5}H_{9}N
Molar mass	83.13 g/mol
Appearance	Colorless liquid
Density	0.735 g/cm^{3}, liquid
Boiling point	91 °C (196 °F; 364 K)
Solubility in water	N/A
- Except where otherwise noted, data are given for materials in their standard state (at 25 °C [77 °F], 100 kPa). verify (what is ?) Infobox references

tert-Butyl isocyanide is an organic compound with the formula Me_{3}CNC (Me = methyl, CH_{3}). It is an isocyanide, commonly called isonitrile or carbylamine, as defined by the functional group C≡N-R. tert-Butyl isocyanide, like most alkyl isocyanides, is a reactive colorless liquid with an extremely unpleasant odor. It forms stable complexes with transition metals and can insert into metal-carbon bonds.

tert-Butyl isocyanide is prepared by a Hofmann carbylamine reaction. In this conversion, a dichloromethane solution of tert-butylamine is treated with chloroform and aqueous sodium hydroxide in the presence of catalytic amount of the phase transfer catalyst benzyltriethylammonium chloride.

Me_{3}CNH_{2} + CHCl_{3} + 3 NaOH → Me_{3}CNC + 3 NaCl + 3 H_{2}O

tert-Butyl isocyanide is isomeric with pivalonitrile, also known as tert-butyl cyanide. The difference, as with all carbylamine analogs of nitriles, is that the bond joining the CN functional group to the parent molecule is made on the nitrogen, not the carbon.

== Coordination chemistry ==
By virtue of the lone electron pair on carbon, isocyanides serves as ligands in coordination chemistry, especially with metals in the 0, +1, and +2 oxidation states. tert-Butyl isocyanide has been shown to stabilize metals in unusual oxidation states, such as Pd(I).

Pd(dba)_{2} + PdCl_{2}(C_{6}H_{5}CN)_{2} + 4 t-BuNC → [(t-BuNC)_{2}PdCl]_{2} + 2 dba + 2 C_{6}H_{5}CN

tert-Butyl isocyanide can form hepta-coordinate homoleptic complexes, despite having a large t-Bu group, which is held far away from the metal center because of the linearity of the M-C≡N-C linkages.

tert-Butyl isocycanide forms complexes that are stoichiometrically analogous to certain binary metal carbonyl complexes, such as Fe_{2}(CO)_{9} and Fe_{2}(tBuNC)_{9}.

== Safety ==
tert-Butyl isocyanide is toxic. Its behavior is similar to that of its close electronic relative carbon monoxide.
