= Isobutyronitrile =

Names
- Preferred IUPAC name 2-Methylpropanenitrile
- Other names Isopropyl cyanide; 2-Methylpropionitrile

Identifiers
CAS Number	78-82-0
3D model (JSmol)	Interactive image
ChEBI	CHEBI:28638
ChEMBL	ChEMBL1492874
ChemSpider	6311
ECHA InfoCard	100.001.043
EC Number	201-147-5
KEGG	C02420
PubChem CID	6559
RTECS number	TZ4900000
UNII	699AWF2WV2
UN number	2284
CompTox Dashboard (EPA)	DTXSID5026461
- InChI: InChI=1S/C4H7N/c1-4(2)3-5/h4H,1-2H3 Key: LRDFRRGEGBBSRN-UHFFFAOYSA-N; InChI=1/C4H7N/c1-4(2)3-5/h4H,1-2H3 Key: LRDFRRGEGBBSRN-UHFFFAOYAP
- SMILES: CC(C)C#N

Properties
Chemical formula	C_{4}H_{7}N
Molar mass	69.107 g·mol^{−1}
Appearance	Colorless liquid
Odor	Almond-like
Melting point	−72 °C (−98 °F; 201 K)
Boiling point	103.9 °C (219.0 °F; 377.0 K)
Solubility in water	Very soluble in organics
Refractive index (n_{D})	1.372
Dipole moment	4.29 D

Hazards
- GHS labelling
Pictograms	(GHS02: Flammable) (GHS06: Toxic) (GHS07: Exclamation mark) (GHS08: Health hazard)
Signal word	Danger
Hazard statements	H224, H225, H300, H301, H310, H311, H315, H319, H331, H335, H370, H371, H372
Precautionary statements	P210, P233, P240, P241, P242, P243, P260, P262, P264, P270, P271, P280, P301+P310, P302+P350, P302+P352, P303+P361+P353, P304+P340, P305+P351+P338, P307+P311, P309+P311, P310, P311, P312, P314, P321, P322, P330, P332+P313, P337+P313, P361, P362, P363, P370+P378, P403+P233, P403+P235, P405, P501
Flash point	47 °C (117 °F; 320 K)
- Except where otherwise noted, data are given for materials in their standard state (at 25 °C [77 °F], 100 kPa). Infobox references

Isobutyronitrile is a complex organic molecule that has recently been found in several meteorites arrived from space. The singularity of this chemical is due to the fact that it is the only one among the molecules arriving from the universe that has a branched, rather than straight, carbon backbone. The backbone is also larger than usual, in comparison with others.

== History ==
Both isobutyronitrile and its straight-chain isomer, Butyronitrile, were detected by astronomers from Cornell University, the Max Planck Institute for Radio Astronomy and the University of Cologne by means of using the Atacama Large Millimeter/submillimeter Array (ALMA) — a set of radiotelescopes in Chile. The chemical was found within an immense gas cloud in the star-forming region called Sagittarius B2. This interstellar space is located at about 300 light years away from the Galactic Center Sgr A*. and about 27,000 light years from Earth.

About 50 individual features for isobutyronitrile and 120 for normal propyl cyanide (n-propyl cyanide) were identified in the ALMA spectrum of the Sagittarius B2 region. The published astrochemical model indicates that both isomers are produced within or upon dust grain ice mantles through the addition of molecular radicals, albeit via differing reaction pathways.

Scientists have come to the conclusion that isobutyronitrile could have been essential for the creation of primary life. The discovery of this particular cyanide suggests that the complex molecules needed for life may have their origins in interstellar space. Those molecules would have been rising during the process of early star formation and been transferred to our planet later.

According to Rob Garrod, this detection opens a new frontier in the field regarding the complexity of molecules that can be formed in interstellar space and that might ultimately find their way to the surfaces of planets. How widespread these complex organic molecules really are in our Galaxy is one of the questions raised by this new discovery.

== Composition and structure ==
Isobutyronitrile (C_{3}H_{7}CN) contains a carbon atom bounded by a simple link to two methyl (-CH_{3}) structures and to a cyano group (–CN). The cyano group is constituted by a triple link bond between one carbon and one nitrogen atom. The greatest contribution to the production of i-PrCN comes from the reaction of CN radicals (which are accreted from the gas) with the CH3CHCH3 radical, whereas the dominant formation mechanism for n-PrCN is the addition of C2H5 and CH2CN, a process that has no equivalent for the production of i-PrCN. i-PrCN production dominates all reaction mechanisms for which parallel processes are available to both isomers.It is also the most complex shaped molecule in the history.

=== Rotational spectrum ===
The rotational spectrum of the branched isomer iso- or i-PrCN, which had only been previously studied to a limited extent in the microwave region, has recently been extensively recorded in the laboratory from the microwave to the submillimeter wave region along with a redetermination of the dipole moment, which appears to be 4.29 D. The latter uncertainty assumes the same source size and rotation temperature for both isomers.

Scientists were able to observe transitions in both types of cyanides. Thus, the microwave spectrum of the isobutyronitrile has been recorded from 26.5 to 40.0 GHz. Three different excited states were found in the R-branch of i-PrCN. In the experiments carried out by the scientists, different parameters were studied: The bond distance between the different atoms and the angles between them. The results indicated that the bond distance between de carbon atom and the cyano group is 1.501 Å; the angle between the three carbon atoms is 113º while the angle between the CCC and the CN bond is 53.8º. Two different torsional modes were observed, according to the relative intensities of the excited state lines, the frequencies of which were, respectively, 200±20 and 249±10 cm^{−1}. This could give an idea of the internal rotation energy of this molecule, which has been found to be of 3.3 Kcal/mole.

=== Importance in life's origin ===
The branched carbon structure of isobutyronitrile is a common feature in those molecules that are considered to be necessary for life – such as amino acids, which are the building blocks of proteins. This new discovery lends weight to the idea that biologically crucial molecules, like the mentioned amino acids which are also commonly found in meteorites, were produced even before the process of star formation or before planets such as the Earth were formed.

The importance of the cyanides found in comets remains in their C-N bond. This bond has been proved to participate in the abiotic amino acid synthesis.

The two cyanide molecules – isobutyronitrile and n-butyronitrile – are the largest molecules yet detected in any star-forming region.

== Properties ==
- Nitrogen oxides are released during its combustion.
- Highly stable under ordinary conditions.
- Clear colourless liquid the density of which is lower than that of water.
- Highly flammable liquid and vapor.
- Its physical state is clear liquid.
- Its distillation range is 115-118 °C.

Some more specific properties are:

- Gravity: 0.76
- Vapor density: 2.38
- Refractive index: 1.372
- Dielectric Constant: 20.80

=== Hazards ===
- Contact with eyes causes irritation
- Fatal if swallowed or if inhaled. It causes weakness, headache, confusion, nausea and vomiting.
- Toxic in contact with skin and it may cause damage to organs.

== Applications ==
3D space-filling model of the isobutyronitrile molecule.

Chemically speaking, the simple inorganic cyanides behave as chlorides in many ways. Organic nitriles act as solvents and are reacted further for various applications such as: Working as an extraction solvent for fatty acids, oils and unsaturated hydrocarbons. They are also good solvents for spinning and casting and extractive distillation based on its selective miscibility with organic compounds and can act as removing agents of colouring matters and aromatic alcohols. Inorganic cyanides are also able to perform a recrystallization of steroids or to be compounds for organic synthesis. Therefore, they basically act as solvents or chemical intermediates in biochemistry (pesticide sequencing and DNA synthesis, for example).

Some other useful applications of these organic nitriles are the performance of high-pressure liquid chromatographic analysis. Also, the action they have as catalysts and components of transition-metal complex catalysts, stabilizers for chlorinated solvents. Furthermore, they may work as chemical intermediates and solvents for perfumes and pharmaceutical products.

== Bibliography ==
- Belloche, Arnaud; et al. (2015-10-23). "Detection of a branched alkyl molecule in the interstellar medium: iso-propyl cyanide". Science. 345 (6204): 1584–1587. arXiv:1410.2607. Bibcode:2014Sci...345.1584B. doi:10.1126/science.1256678. PMID 25258074. S2CID 14573206.
- Öberg KI, Guzmán VV; et al. (2015-10-27). "The comet-like composition of a protoplanetary disk as revealed by complex cyanides". Nature. 520 (7546): 198–201. arXiv:1505.06347. Bibcode:2015Natur.520..198O. doi:10.1038/nature14276. PMID 25855455. S2CID 205242974.
