= Methacrylamide =

Names
- Preferred IUPAC name 2-Methylprop-2-enamide
- Other names 2-Methacrylamide; 2-Methyl-2-propenamide; 2-Methylacrylamide; 2-Methylpropenamide; α-Methyl acrylic amide; Methacrylic acid amide; Methacrylic amide; Methylacrylamide

Identifiers
CAS Number	79-39-0
3D model (JSmol)	Interactive image
ChemSpider	6346
ECHA InfoCard	100.001.094
PubChem CID	6595
UNII	K67NG89J77
CompTox Dashboard (EPA)	DTXSID8029600
- InChI: InChI=1S/C4H7NO/c1-3(2)4(5)6/h1H2,2H3,(H2,5,6) Key: FQPSGWSUVKBHSU-UHFFFAOYSA-N; InChI=1/C4H7NO/c1-3(2)4(5)6/h1H2,2H3,(H2,5,6) Key: FQPSGWSUVKBHSU-UHFFFAOYAG
- SMILES: O=C(\C(=C)C)N

Properties
Chemical formula	C_{4}H_{7}NO
Molar mass	85.106 g·mol^{−1}
Appearance	White odorless crystals
Density	1.10-1.12 g/cm^{3}
Melting point	106 to 109 °C (223 to 228 °F; 379 to 382 K)
Boiling point	215 °C (419 °F; 488 K)
Solubility in water	202 g/L (20 °C)

Hazards
Autoignition temperature	510 °C (950 °F; 783 K)
- Except where otherwise noted, data are given for materials in their standard state (at 25 °C [77 °F], 100 kPa). Infobox references

Methacrylamide is the organic compound with the formula CH_{2}=C(CH_{3})C(O)NH_{2}. A colorless or white solid, it is a monomer for the production of polymers and copolymers, some of which are used in hydrogels. Methacrylamide is also a precursor of methyl methacrylate.
