= Cyanoacetamide =

2-Cyanoacetamide

Names
- Preferred IUPAC name 2-Cyanoacetamide
- Other names Malonamide nitrile 3-Nitrilopropionamide

Identifiers
CAS Number	107-91-5
3D model (JSmol)	Interactive image
ChemSpider	7610
ECHA InfoCard	100.003.211
EC Number	203-531-8
PubChem CID	7898
UNII	YBK38G2YXH
CompTox Dashboard (EPA)	DTXSID2051552
- InChI: InChI=1S/C3H4N2O/c4-2-1-3(5)6/h1H2,(H2,5,6) Key: DGJMPUGMZIKDRO-UHFFFAOYSA-N
- SMILES: N#CCC(=O)N

Properties
Chemical formula	C_{3}H_{4}N_{2}O
Molar mass	84.078 g·mol^{−1}
Density	1.163 g/cm^{3}
Melting point	119 to 121 °C (246 to 250 °F; 392 to 394 K)
Boiling point	351.2 °C (664.2 °F; 624.3 K)
Acidity (pK_{a})	ca. 11; 13.24

Hazards
- GHS labelling
Pictograms	(GHS07: Exclamation mark)
Signal word	Warning
Hazard statements	H302, H315, H319, H335
Precautionary statements	P261, P264, P270, P271, P280, P301+P312, P302+P352, P304+P340, P305+P351+P338, P312, P321, P330, P332+P313, P337+P313, P362, P403+P233, P405, P501
- Except where otherwise noted, data are given for materials in their standard state (at 25 °C [77 °F], 100 kPa). Infobox references

2-Cyanoacetamide is an organic compound. It is an acetic amide with a nitrile functional group.

== Uses ==
Cyanoacetamide is used in spectrofluorimetric methods to determine the activity of antihistamine H1 receptor antagonistic drugs such as ebastine, cetirizine dihydrochloride and fexofenadine hydrochloride.

== Preparation ==
2-Cyanoacetamide is prepared from chloroacetic acid via Kolbe nitrile synthesis followed by Fischer esterification and ester aminolysis.

== See also ==
- Chloroacetamide
- Ethyl chloroacetate
