= Butyronitrile =

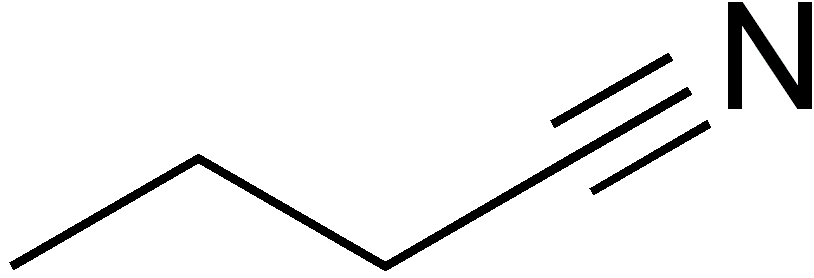

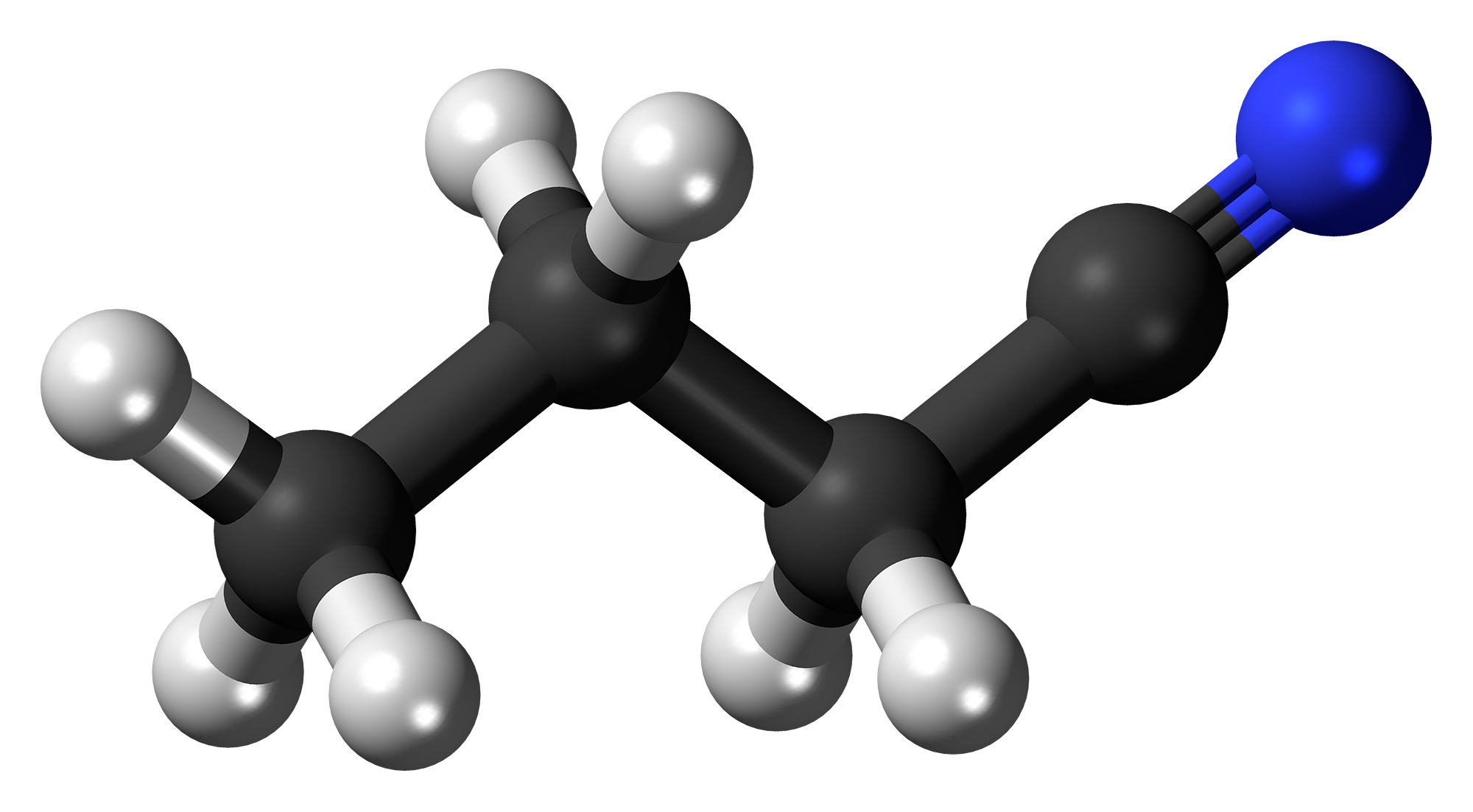

Names
- Preferred IUPAC name Butanenitrile
- Other names: 1-Cyanopropane; Propyl cyanide; n-Butyronitrile

Identifiers
CAS Number	109-74-0
3D model (JSmol)	Interactive image
Beilstein Reference	1361452
ChEBI	CHEBI:51937
ChemSpider	7717
ECHA InfoCard	100.003.365
EC Number	203-700-6
MeSH	N-butyronitrile
PubChem CID	8008
RTECS number	ET8750000
UNII	O3V36V0W0M
UN number	2411
CompTox Dashboard (EPA)	DTXSID1026823
- InChI: InChI=1S/C4H7N/c1-2-3-4-5/h2-3H2,1H3 Key: KVNRLNFWIYMESJ-UHFFFAOYSA-N
- SMILES: CCCC#N

Properties
Chemical formula	C_{4}H_{7}N
Molar mass	69.107 g·mol^{−1}
Appearance	Colorless
Odor	Sharp and suffocating
Density	794 mg mL^{−1}
Melting point	−111.90 °C; −169.42 °F; 161.25 K
Boiling point	117.6 °C; 243.6 °F; 390.7 K
Solubility in water	0.033 g/100 mL
Solubility	soluble in benzene miscible in alcohol, ether, dimethylformamide
Vapor pressure	3.1 kPa
Henry's law constant (k_{H})	190 μmol Pa^{−1} kg^{−1}
Magnetic susceptibility (χ)	−49.4·10^{−6} cm^{3}/mol
Refractive index (n_{D})	1.38385
Dipole moment	3.5

Thermochemistry
Heat capacity (C)	134.2 J K^{−1} mol^{−1}
Std enthalpy of formation (Δ_{f}H^{⦵}_{298})	−6.8 – −4.8 kJ mol^{−1}
Std enthalpy of combustion (Δ_{c}H^{⦵}_{298})	−2.579 MJ mol^{−1}

Hazards
- GHS labelling
Pictograms	(GHS02: Flammable) (GHS06: Toxic)
Signal word	Danger
Hazard statements	H225, H301, H311, H331
Precautionary statements	P210, P261, P280, P301+P310, P311
NFPA 704 (fire diamond)	3 3 0
Flash point	18 °C (64 °F; 291 K)
Autoignition temperature	488 °C (910 °F; 761 K)
Explosive limits	1.65%–?
- Lethal dose or concentration (LD, LC)
LD_{50} (median dose)	50 mg kg^{−1} (oral, rat)
- NIOSH (US health exposure limits)
PEL (Permissible)	none
REL (Recommended)	TWA 8 ppm (22 mg/m^{3})
IDLH (Immediate danger)	N.D.

Related compounds
Related alkanenitriles	Isobutyronitrile; Propanenitrile; Malononitrile; Pivalonitrile; Succinonitrile; Glutaronitrile
- Except where otherwise noted, data are given for materials in their standard state (at 25 °C [77 °F], 100 kPa). verify (what is ?) Infobox references

Butyronitrile or butanenitrile or propyl cyanide, is a nitrile with the formula C_{3}H_{7}CN. This colorless liquid is miscible with most polar organic solvents.

== Uses ==
Butyronitrile is mainly used as a precursor to the poultry drug amprolium.

It also has recognized use in the synthesis of Etifelmine.

== Synthesis ==
Butyronitrile is prepared industrially by the ammoxidation of n-butanol:

C_{3}H_{7}CH_{2}OH + NH_{3} + O_{2} → C_{3}H_{7}CN + 3 H_{2}O

== Occurrence in space ==
Butyronitrile has been detected in the Large Molecule Heimat in Sagittarius B2 cloud along with other complex organic molecules.
