= DBNPA =

- Skeletal formula of DBNPA

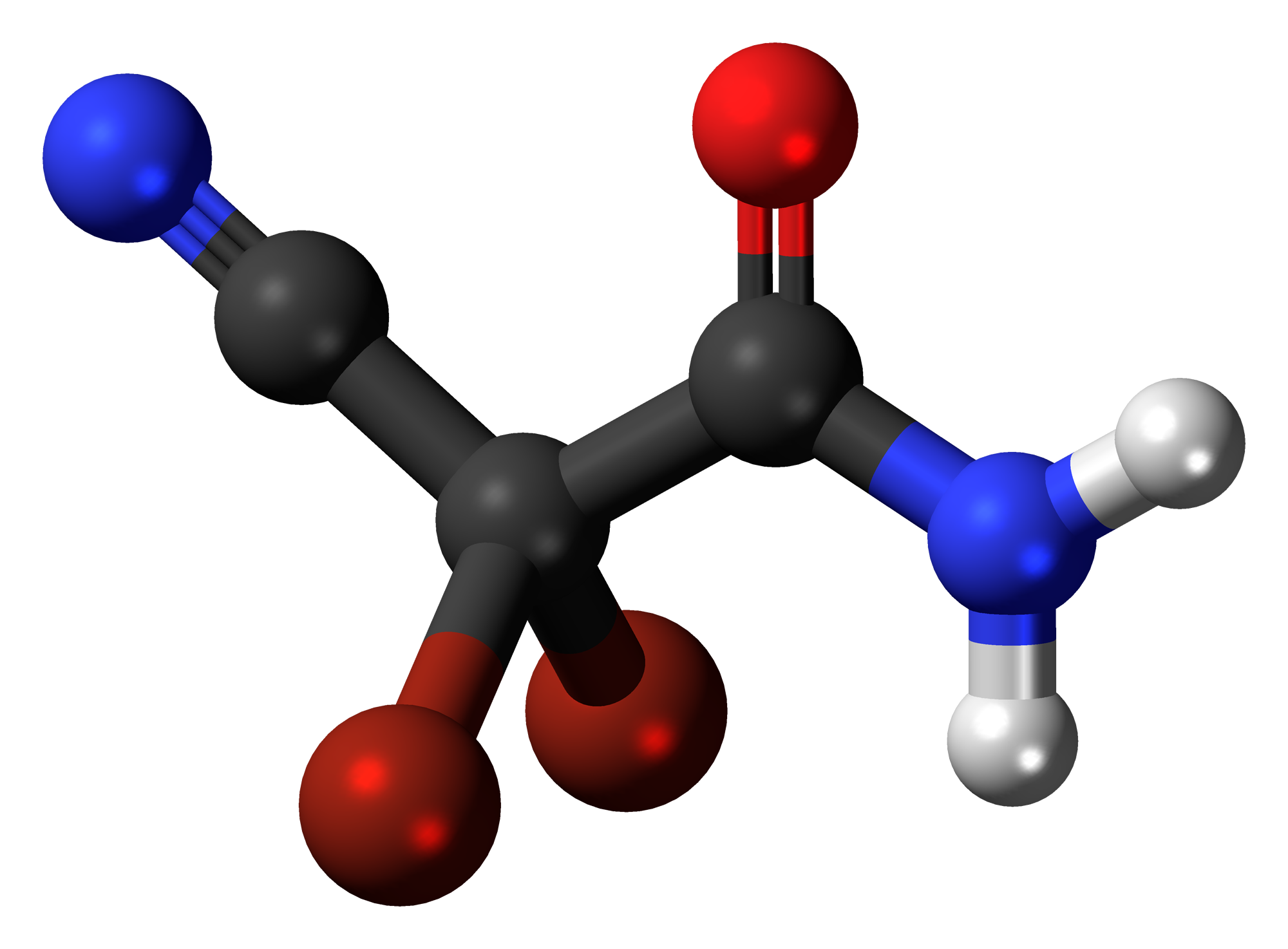
Ball and stick model of DBNPA
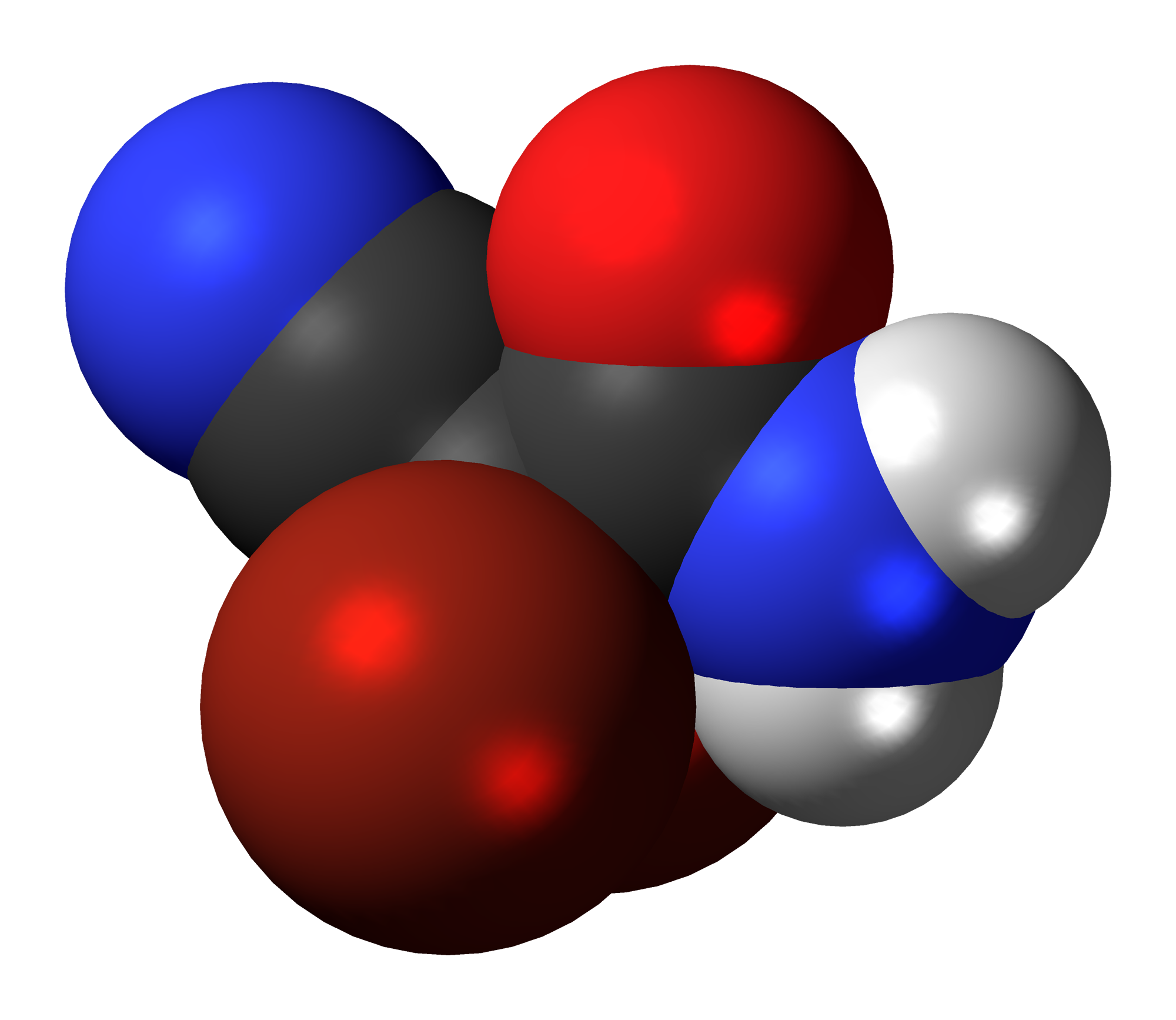
Spacefill model of DBNPA

Names
- Preferred IUPAC name 2,2-Dibromo-2-cyanoacetamide
- Other names: Dibromocyano acetic acid amide; 2,2-Dibromo-3-nitrilopropionamide; 2,2-Dibromo-2-carbamoylacetonitrile; α,α-Dibromo-α-cyanoacetamide; Dibromocyanoacetamide

Identifiers
CAS Number	10222-01-2
3D model (JSmol)	Interactive image
ChemSpider	23422
ECHA InfoCard	100.030.477
EC Number	233-539-7
MeSH	2,2-dibromo-3-nitrilopropionamide
PubChem CID	25059
RTECS number	AB5956000
UNII	7N51QGL6MJ
UN number	1759
CompTox Dashboard (EPA)	DTXSID5032361
- InChI: InChI=1S/C3H2Br2N2O/c4-3(5,1-6)2(7)8/h(H2,7,8) Key: UUIVKBHZENILKB-UHFFFAOYSA-N
- SMILES: NC(=O)C(Br)(Br)C#N

Properties
Chemical formula	C_{3}H_{2}Br_{2}N_{2}O
Molar mass	241.870 g·mol^{−1}
Appearance	White, translucent crystals
Melting point	122 to 125 °C (252 to 257 °F; 395 to 398 K)

Hazards
- GHS labelling
Pictograms	(GHS05: Corrosive) (GHS07: Exclamation mark) (GHS09: Environmental hazard)
Signal word	Danger
Hazard statements	H314, H317, H400
Precautionary statements	P273, P280, P305+P351+P338, P310
- Lethal dose or concentration (LD, LC)
LD_{50} (median dose)	10 mg kg^{−1} (intravenous, mouse)

Related compounds
Related compounds	Cyanoacetamide
- Except where otherwise noted, data are given for materials in their standard state (at 25 °C [77 °F], 100 kPa). Infobox references

DBNPA (2,2-dibromo-3-nitrilopropionamide) is a brominated acetamide. Its synonyms include 2,2-dibromo-2-carbamoylacetonitrile, α,α-dibromo-α-cyanoacetamide, and dibromocyanoacetamide. The physical appearance of DBNPA is an off-white solid at ambient temperatures with a mild antiseptic odor and is often sold in powder form. DBNPA is often used as an algicide, bactericide and fungicide in industrial water treatment systems and as a preservative used in the manufacture of paper, glues, coatings, enhanced oil recovery systems and metalworking.

== History ==
The first documented synthesis of DBNPA was carried out by Bernhard Conrad Hesse in 1896. DBNPA's practical applications were not explored until 1947, when it started being used as a seed and plant fungicide. Despite this early use, its complete potential as an antibacterial agent was not yet understood.

By the early 1970s, DBNPA had gained attention for its effectiveness in controlling microbial contaminations in industrial settings. It started being widely used as a slimicide in papermaking systems, cooling water treatment, and other industries vulnerable to biofouling. DBNPA's demonstrated biocidal efficacy led to its official registration as a pesticide in the US in 1972.

Beyond its typical use as a biocide, DBNPA has been investigated for other uses in recent years. Research has investigated its potential as an alternative to antibiotics in bacterial control during ethanol fermentation. DBNPA is often used today as a fast-acting antimicrobial agent to eliminate microbial contamination in manufacturing and industrial processes. Applications needing efficient microbial control with little environmental persistence favour the use of DBNPA due to its quick disintegration in water. Its effectiveness and safety in a variety of industries are still being explored.

== Structure and reactivity ==
DBNPA is a halogenated cyanoacetamide compound, characterized by the presence of two bromine atoms at the 2,2-position of the carbon backbone. DBNPA contains a cyano (-CN) group and an amide (-CONH_{2}) group attached to a three-carbon chain. The molecular formula is C_{3}H_{2}Br_{2}N_{2}O, with a molecular weight of 241.87 g/mol.

DBNPA is highly reactive due to the two electron-withdrawing bromine atoms and a cyano (-CN) group attached to the central carbon backbone. These substituents form a very electron-deficient core, making it highly vulnerable to nucleophilic attacks. The cyano group increases the reactivity of the compound by stabilizing the electron deficiency while the amide (−CONH_{2}) group affects its water solubility. The electron-deficient carbon adjacent to the bromine atoms plays a critical role in DBNPA’s biocidal properties, leading to the disruption of microbial cellular functions.

Since DBNPA is a highly reactive molecule, it is prone to pH-dependent hydrolysis at neutral and alkaline conditions because of the weak carbon-bromide bonds. DBNPA is also susceptible to be broken down in reducing environments by stepwise debromination. Additionally, DBNPA is highly sensitive to ultraviolet (UV) exposure, which accelerates its degradation in aqueous environments.

Due to its reactive nature, DBNPA must be stabilized in products to prevent premature degradation before application. The rapid breakdown of DBNPA in water and light-exposed environments reduces concerns about long-term contamination but raises considerations regarding the toxicity of its degradation byproducts, such as DBAA and DBAN.

== Synthesis ==
The process used to create DBNPA is acid-catalyzed bromination of 3-cyanoacetamide. Polyethylene glycol is often used as the solvent due to its ability to dissolve both reactants and products effectively.

Next, the bromination step is initiated by introducing bromine (Br_{2}) or an alternative brominating agent, such as sodium bromide (NaBr) with an oxidant. DBNPA is formed as a result of an electrophilic bromination reaction at the α-carbon of 3-cyanoacetamide. Isolation and purification of DBNPA are carried out after bromination. The reaction mixture is neutralized, and the product is extracted and purified. The next step is drying, which yields DBNPA in its stable crystalline form. Usually, the reaction temperature is kept between 10 and 20 °C to minimize unintended side reactions. The concentration of bromine is carefully controlled, because an excess can lead to the formation of undesired byproducts that reduces the overall yield.

The stability of DBNPA depends on the storage conditions. Due to its incompatibility with metals, DBNPA should be stored in non-metal containers. It must also be stored away from UV exposure, as this can degrade DBNPA.

== Reactions ==
DBNPA decomposition is dominated by two reaction pathways: pH-dependent hydrolysis and light-catalyzed reactions with reducing nucleophiles. DBNPA's electrophilic bromine atoms and electron-withdrawing cyano (-CN) group play a major role in determining its reactivity. A number of variables, including temperature, pH, light exposure, and reducing agents, have a substantial impact on the rate and mechanism of DBNPA breakdown. Different organic and inorganic byproducts could therefore develop, which could have an impact on DBNPA's toxicity and biocidal effectiveness.

=== Hydrolysis ===
DBNPA undergoes rapid pH-dependent hydrolysis in aqueous environments, leading to the formation of different degradation products. The C-Br bonds break down rapidly into smaller organic and inorganic byproducts when exposed to neutral to alkaline environments due to nucleophilic substitution. DBNPA can endure longer in acidic settings since the hydrolysis rate is lower.

The pH has a significant impact on DBNPA's breakdown. The main degradation product at pH 5 is dibromoacetic acid (DBAA), which makes up 30.6% of all DBNPA breakdown products. The breakdown mechanism changes as the pH rises, favouring the synthesis of dibromoacetonitrile (DBAN), which dominates at pH 7 (54.5%) and pH 9 (38.6%). Ammonia, carbon dioxide, bromide ions, and cyanoacetic acid are produced by further hydrolysis in neutral or slightly alkaline conditions.

=== Nucleophilic substitution ===
DBNPA reacts with nucleophiles due to its electrophilic bromine atoms. One of the most important reactions is the formation of thioether derivatives with thiol groups (R-SH).

R-SH + DBNPA → R-S-CH_{2}C(Br)(NO_{2})NH_{2}

Similarly, DBNPA reacts with amines (R-NH_{2}) to form substituted amide compounds.

R-NH_{2} + DBNPA → R-NH-C(Br)(NO_{2})NH_{2}

In basic environments, DBNPA undergoes nucleophilic substitution by hydroxide ions, which initiates hydrolysis. This reaction reduces the environmental persistence of DBNPA by breaking it down into smaller degradation products.

DBNPA + HO^{−} → Hydrolysis products

=== Reductive debromination ===
In the presence of reducing agents, DBNPA undergoes stepwise debromination, leading to less brominated derivatives or complete dehalogenation.

DBNPA + Reducing Agent → Mono- or Debrominated Products

=== Photodegradation ===
Additionally, DBNPA is prone to light-induced degradation, especially when exposed to ultraviolet (UV) radiation. Photocatalytic breakdown leads to debromination and the formation of less reactive intermediates, further accelerating its degradation in aqueous systems.

== Available forms ==
DBNPA’s available form is dependent on its intended industrial use. Its pure state is a crystalline solid, with a melting point of 123-126 °C. It is slightly soluble in water (1.5 g per 100 g at 25 °C) but dissolves readily in certain organic solvents like acetone and ethanol. For practical applications, DBPNA is most commonly used in the form of a mixture of 20% active solution combined with water and polyethylene glycol, which enhances its stability and handling in aqueous systems. Its solid forms are also available but are mainly used for packaging and storage; it is often packaged in containers within 25 kg woven bags in order to prevent moisture exposure in storage mechanisms.

== Mechanism of action ==
DBNPA is a moderate electrophile. It acts as a broad-spectrum, non-oxidizing biocide by very quickly disrupting important cellular processes in microorganisms like bacteria, fungi and algae, ultimately causing cell death. Its primary mechanism involves penetrating the cell membrane and targeting nucleophilic sites, and relies on bromine interacting with sulfur containing groups on proteins critical for cellular metabolism. Once inside the cell, DBNPA reacts with these sulfur-containing groups, forming covalent bonds that inactivate enzymes involved in redox equations. This disruption is irreversible and stops energy production, leading to cell death within 5–10 minutes of exposure. To summarize, DBNPA stops biofouling in water systems, which is the undesirable accumulation of microorganisms, very quickly, by permanently attacking microbiological cell walls.

The non-oxidative mechanism distinguishes DBNPA from other oxidizing agents like bleach; instead of oxidizing cellular components broadly, DBNPA selectively targets functional protein groups, making it effective against pathogens like gram-negative bacteria and fungi. For example, in cooling water systems, DBNPA has been shown to reduce gram-negative bacteria Legionella pneumophila counts by 99.9% within 10 minutes, at low concentrations of 5 mg/L.

There may also be a secondary mechanism, through which DBNPA’s nitrile group contributes towards its biocidal activity by a potential interaction with other nucleophilic sites like amino groups on proteins or amino acids, however, this mechanism is not widely studied, so not much is known about it.

Unlike other similar biocides which require prolonged exposure in order to be effective, like isothiazolinone, DBNPA’s fast reaction is attributed towards its chemical instability in aqueous environments, where it is able to degrade within hours. This instability ensures that microorganisms are exposed to a high initial dose but the likelihood of resistance development is small, since surviving cells are not exposed to sublethal concentrations over extended periods of time. This rapid degradation also means that DBNPA is only well-suited for short-term microbial control, but not long-term preservation, making it serve a different purpose to more stable biocides.

== Indications ==
DBNPA is used as a disinfectant, bactericide, algicide, slime remover, and mildew inhibitor in several industrial applications. It is frequently used to regulate the growth of bacteria, algae, and slime in oilfield water injection systems and circulating cooling water systems. DBNPA is used in the paper industry as a slime remover, bactericide, and algicide to keep machinery free of microorganisms and maintain product quality. Additionally, it is utilized as a preservative to prevent microbiological deterioration in paints, waxes, inks, detergents, surfactants, slurries, and resins. DBNPA also serves as a fungicide and algaecide in municipal water landscapes, guaranteeing water safety and clarity, and as a biocide in process water and air purifier systems in the machinery manufacturing sector. The concentration used when it is being used as a water treatment slime stripper is 30~50 mg/L. When it is being used for water treatment, as a bactericide, it is used at a concentration of 10~20 mg/L.

In terms of analytical detection in industrial and environmental samples, high-performance liquid chromatography with UV detection, measuring absorption at 230 nm, detects DBNPA at extremely low concentrations (>0.1 mg/L) in water samples. Gas chromatography-mass spectrometry can also identify and quantify DBNPA and the associated degradation products, (detection limit is 0.05 mg/L) in environmental samples.

== Efficacy and side effects ==
DBNPA was used to limit bacterial growth in different water applications, such as cooling water and paper processing. In these applications, positive application of DBNPA were instantaneous antimicrobial activity and rapid chemical breakdown into relatively non-toxic by-products. These applications could be beneficial in the ethanol industry

=== Medical efficacy ===
The microbiological efficacy of DBNPA against bacteria coupled with the degradation results found early in the corn-to-ethanol process, could allow this biocide to replace antibiotics in the corn-to-ethanol biofuel industry. DBNPA can be used to protect against bacterial infection of the corn-to-ethanol process, saving on costs of raw materials, finished products, and post bacterial infection clean-outs, but it is also suggested that use of this biocide can help prevent antibiotic resistance.

Adverse effects

Exposure to DBNPA can lead to several health concerns like acute toxicity, skin and eye irritation and respiratory effects. Potential for occupational exposure to DBNPA exists during manufacture, at bulk unloading, storage and staging areas, but also during sampling and maintenance operations in facilities while using the chemical as an additive in the manufacture of other products. A much lower potential for exposure exists in facilities using DBNPA in closed manufacturing processes by trained personnel. A positive pressure air-supplied respirator is required when airborne concentrations of DBNPA exceeds the recommended exposure limit. In addition, LANXESS recommends the use of safety glasses with side shields or safety goggles, chemical-resistant gloves, a chemical-resistant protective suit and suitable protective footwear be worn when handling DBNPA. Regarding short-term health effects, DBNPA is very toxic by inhalation and toxic by ingestion. Prolonged exposure may cause severe nose, throat and lung irritation. DBNPA dust may cause mechanical (abrasive) irritation to the skin, eyes and respiratory system and is severely irritating to the eyes and may cause permanent corneal damage. Skin contact may cause an allergic skin reaction. Pre-existing skin disorders may even be aggravated by over-exposure to this product. Regarding long-term health effects, DBNPA contains material that may cause target organ damage, based on animal data. Repeated or prolonged inhalation of DBPNA dust can lead to chronic respiratory problems. Once sensitized, an allergic skin reaction may occur when subsequently exposed to very low levels of DBNPA.

== Toxicity ==
DBNPA exhibits various degrees of toxicity like acute oral toxicity, dermal toxicity and inhalation toxicity while it is stable under normal conditions of use. Contact with strong amines should however be avoided including bases, oxidizing agents and reducing agents. DBNPA is corrosive to mild steel, iron and aluminum. The creation of dust when handling DBNPA should be avoided and precautionary measures against electrostatic discharges should be taken. Avoid heat, open flames and other potential sources of ignition when handling DBNPA. Additionally, DBNPA is corrosive to the eyes. It is moderately toxic by oral or inhalation routes and slightly toxic by the dermal route. DBNPA can kill skin tissue in rabbits when administered at high doses for a prolonged period of time. DBNPA is also a skin sensitizer. In a toxicity study using rats, DBNPA caused breathing difficulty associated with lung or heart disease, as well as weight loss and several deaths at higher doses. When applied to the skin of rats in another study, DBNPA caused changes in body chemistry and dermal irritation at the higher doses. DBNPA is a developmental toxicant in rabbits. It was shown to cause structural alterations (retarded ossification of several fetal skeleton elements) at a maternally non-toxic dose level. DBNPA is not mutagenic. The United States Environmental Protection Agency (EPA) has received several human incident reports in which eye, throat and respiratory irritation, runny nose and headache resulted from spills or misuse of DBNPA.

Acute Toxicity Values for DBNPA. The lower the toxicity category, the higher the toxicity.
Test (species)	Result	Toxicity Category
81-1 Oral Toxicity (rat)	LD50 - 235 mg/kg (M); 178 mg/kg (F)	2
81-2 Dermal Toxicity (rabbit)	LD50 - >2 g/kg	3
81-3 Inhalation Toxicity (rat)	LC50 - 0.32 mg/L	2
81-4 Eye Irritation (rabbit)	Corrosive	1
81-5 Skin Irritation (rabbit)	Moderate dermal irritant	3
81-6 Dermal sensitization (guinea pig)	Dermal sensitizer	n/a

== Effects on animals ==
Ecological exposure in water has severe toxic effects on wildlife. When adult and larval zebrafish were exposed to various concentrations of DBNPA, significant morphological changes and mortality rates were observed. Even relatively low concentrations of DBNPA can have detrimental effects on zebrafish embryonic development, and high concentrations resulted in rapid mortality in adult zebrafish and larvae. DBNPA is highly toxic to mammals and birds concerning acute oral inhalation, but has low toxicity to birds concerning consummation of food. The pesticide is moderately toxic to freshwater fish, estuarine fish and shrimp; moderately to highly toxic to freshwater crustaceans; and highly to very highly toxic to estuarine shellfish and larvae. Many effects to aquatic organisms occur within 24 hours of exposure.

Residual antibiotics in meat were previously found to disrupt its fermentation, increase the risk of infection, and make pathogens less susceptible medically to treatment with antibiotics. Apparently, antibiotics found at low concentrations at the end of the ethanol process can cause high levels of antimicrobial resistance. These problems can be avoided by the application of DBNPA instead of an antibiotic to control bacteria in the ethanol process. This represents a significant advance in the field because DBNPA breaks down prior to the end of the process and thus cannot enter DDGS used for animal foods. This means that the application of DBNPA can circumvent the bacterial antibiotic resistance problem of FDA concern, making it a successful alternative to antibiotics. Then agricultural use of DDGS in feed would represent a safer practice because DBNPA would be degraded, would make the use of antibiotics oblivious and reduce antibiotic resistance in bacteria in bovine, swine, and poultry applications in the food chain.

== Environmental implications ==
DBNPA breaks down chemically in systems rather than biologically, like pharmaceuticals do in living organisms. Both biotic and abiotic processes can cause degradation in soil and water. Half-lives in soil range from 4 to 25 hours, with pH values between 4.8 and 7.5. DBNPA is prone to photodegradation in regions exposed to sunlight and aqueous hydrolysis in moist soil.

DBNPA is not expected to adsorb to sediment and suspended solids in water. In water, the primary product of degradation at pH 5 is dibromoacetic acid, while at pH 7 and 9, the primary product of degradation is dibromoacetonitrile. Additionally, it can break down into bromoacetamide, bromoacetic acid, 2-cyanoacetamide, and oxalic acid. About 4 hours is the half-life. DBNPA is prone to photodegradation.

Its atmospheric fate is that the vapour-phase DBNPA is degraded in the atmosphere by photochemically-produced hydroxyl radicals, and the half-life of this process is approximately 8 days. DBNPA is also susceptible to photolysis in the atmosphere, directly.
