= Transition metal complexes of thiocyanate =

Transition metal complexes of thiocyanate describes coordination complexes containing one or more thiocyanate (SCN^{−}) ligands. The topic also includes transition metal complexes of isothiocyanate. These complexes have few applications but played a significant role in the development of coordination chemistry.

== Structure and bonding ==
Hard metal cations, as classified by HSAB theory, tend to form N-bonded complexes (isothiocyanates), whereas class B or soft metal cations tend to form S-bonded thiocyanate complexes. For the isothiocyanates, the M–N–C angle is usually close to 180°. For the thiocyanates, the M–S–C angle is usually close to 100°.

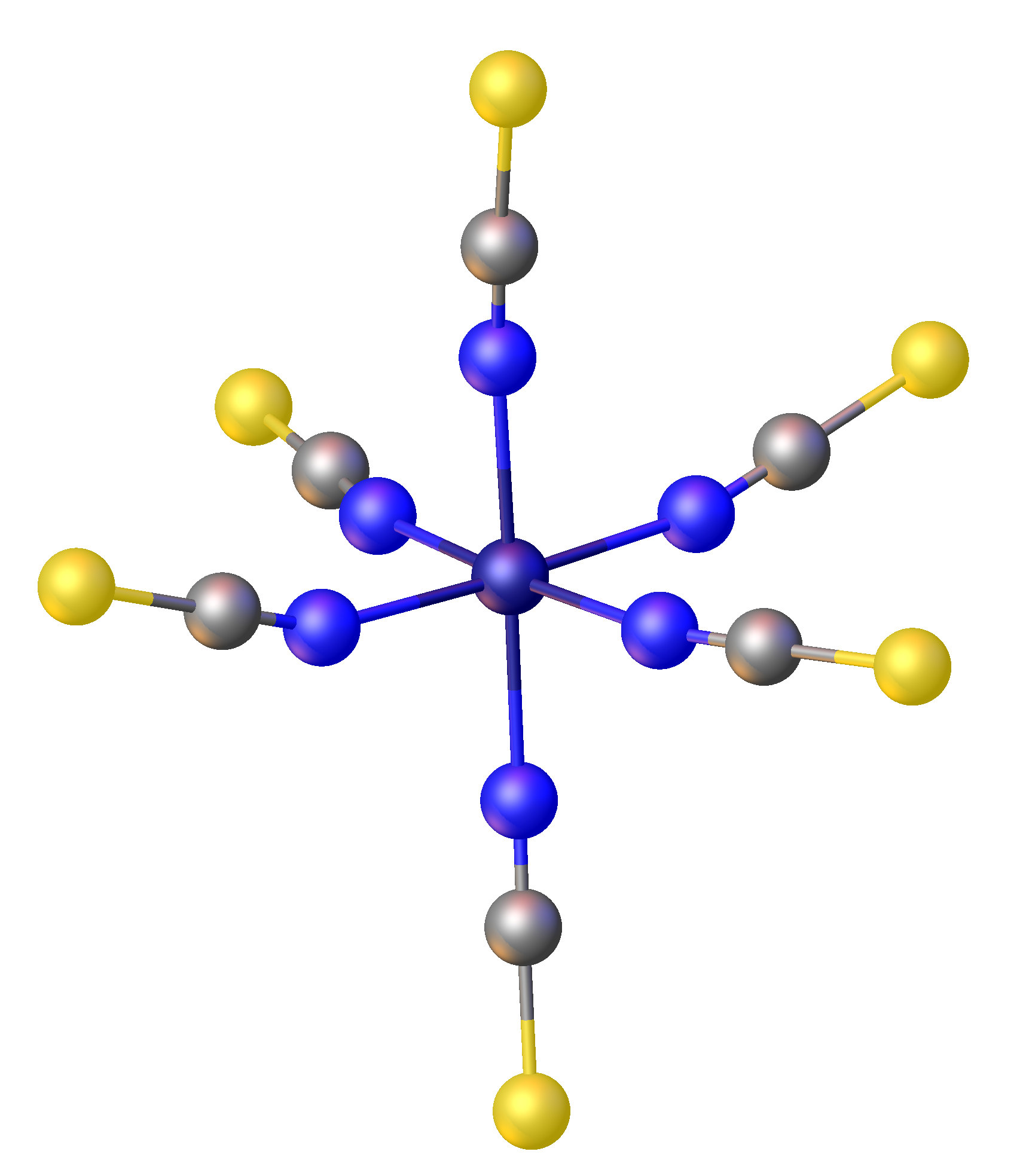
Crystal structure of [Ni^{II}(NCS)_{6}]^{4−}, a homoleptic complex of six isothiocyanate ligands. Color code: blue = N, yellow = S.

Structure of Pd(Me_{2}N(CH_{2})_{3}PPh_{2})(SCN)(NCS) illustrating linkage isomerism of the SCN^{−} ligand.

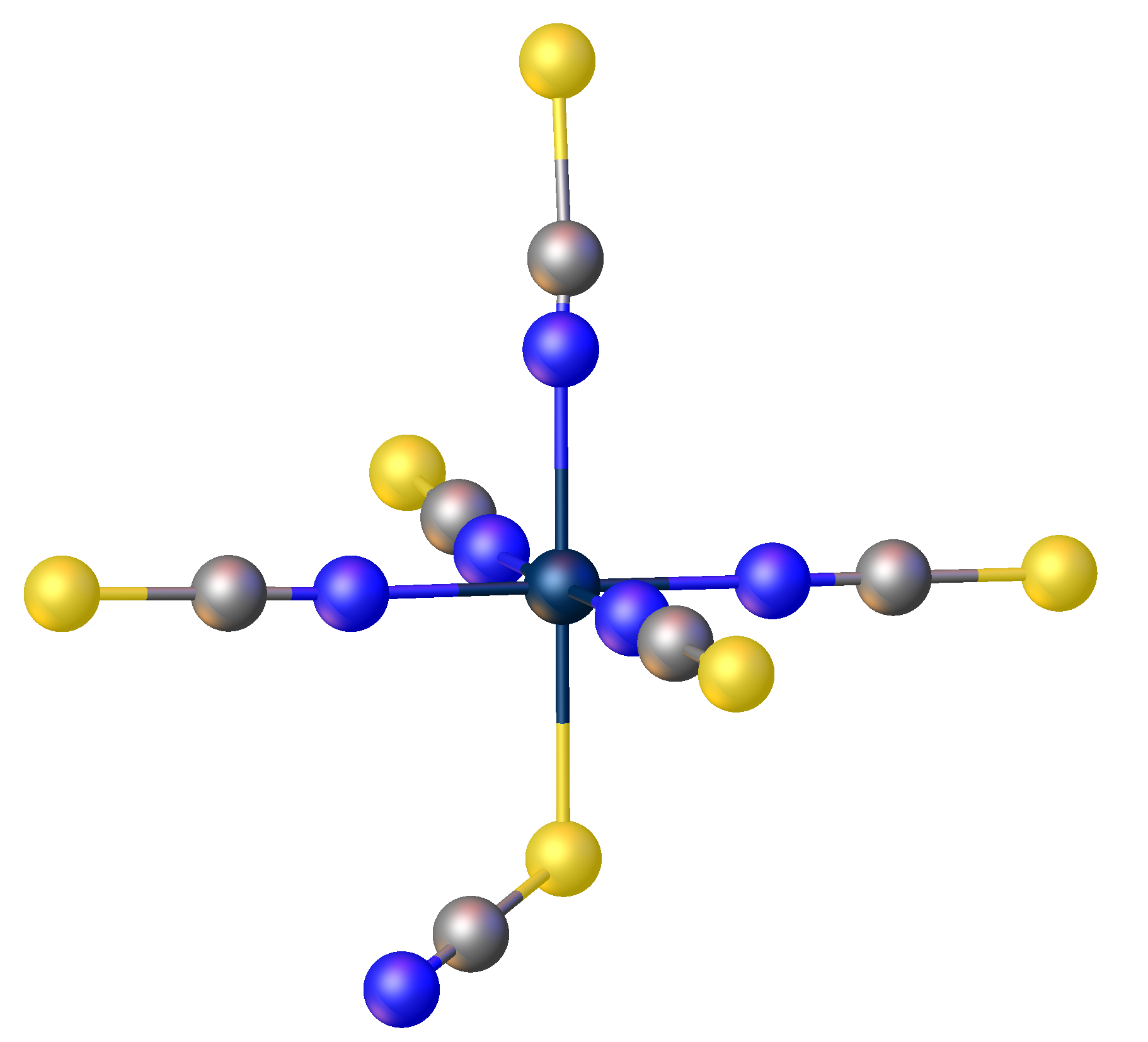
Crystal structure of [Re^{IV}(NCS)_{5}(SCN)]^{2−}. Color code: blue = N, yellow = S.

Structure of the dinuclear complex [Ni^{II}_{2}(SCN)_{8}]^{4−} with a bridging SCN^{−} ligand.

=== Homoleptic complexes ===
Most homoleptic complexes of NCS^{−} feature isothiocyanate ligands (N-bonded). All first-row metals bind thiocyanate in this way. Octahedral complexes [M(NCS)_{6}]^{z−} include M = Ti(III), Cr(III), Mn(II), Fe(III), Ni(II), Mo(III), Tc(IV), and Ru(III). Four-coordinated tetrakis(isothiocyanate) complexes would be tetrahedral since isothiocyanate is a weak-field ligand. Two examples are the deep blue [Co(NCS)_{4}]^{2-} and the green [Ni(NCS)_{4}]^{2−}.

Few homoleptic complexes of NCS^{−} feature thiocyanate ligands (S-bonded). Octahedral complexes include [M(SCN)_{6}]^{3−} (M = Rh and Ir) and [Pt(SCN)_{6}]^{2-}. Square planar complexes include [M(SCN)_{4}]^{z−} (M = Pd(II), Pt(II), and Au(III)). Colorless [Hg(SCN)_{4}]^{2−} is tetrahedral.

Some octahedral isothiocyanate complexes undergo redox reactions reversibly. Orange [Os(NCS)_{6}]^{3-} can be oxidized to violet [Os(NCS)_{6}]^{2−}. The Os–N distances in both derivatives are almost identical at 200 picometers.

=== Linkage isomerism ===
^{−}N=C=S ⇌ N≡C−S^{−}
Resonance structures of the thiocyanate ion

Thiocyanate shares its negative charge approximately equally between sulfur and nitrogen. Thiocyanate can bind metals at either sulfur or nitrogen — it is an ambidentate ligand. Other factors, such as kinetics and solubility, sometimes influence the observed isomer. For example, [Co(NH_{3})_{5}(NCS)]^{2+} is the thermodynamic isomer, but [Co(NH_{3})_{5}(SCN)]^{2+} forms as the kinetic product of the reaction of thiocyanate salts with [Co(NH_{3})_{5}(H_{2}O)]^{3+}.

[Co(NH_{3})_{5}(H_{2}O)]^{3+} + SCN^{−} → [Co(NH_{3})_{5}(SCN)]^{2+} + H_{2}O
[Co(NH_{3})_{5}(SCN)]^{2+} → [Co(NH_{3})_{5}(NCS)]^{2+}

Some complexes of SCN^{−} feature both thiocyanate and isothiocyanate ligands. Examples are found for heavy metals in the middle of the d-period: Ir(III), and Re(IV).

Finally, the linkage isomers [Rh(SCN)_{6}]^{3−} and [Rh(SCN)_{5}(NCS)]^{3−} have been separated and individually characterized.

=== SCN-bridged complexes ===
As a ligand, [SCN]^{−} can also bridge two (M−SCN−M) or even three metals (>SCN− or −SCN<). One example of an SCN-bridged complex is [Ni_{2}(SCN)_{8}]^{4-}.

=== Mixed ligand complexes ===
This article focuses on homoleptic complexes, which are simpler to describe and analyze. Most complexes of SCN^{−}, however are mixed ligand species. Mentioned above is one example, [Co(NH_{3})_{5}(NCS)]^{2+}. Another example is [OsCl_{2}(SCN)_{2}(NCS)_{2}]^{2-}. Reinecke's salt, a precipitating agent, is a derivative of [Cr(NCS)_{4}(NH_{3})_{2}]^{−}.

== Applications and occurrence ==
Thiocyanate complexes are not widely used commercially. Possibly the oldest application of thiocyanate complexes was the use of thiocyanate as a test for ferric ions in aqueous solution. Addition of a thiocyanate salt to a solution containing ferric ions gives a deep red color. The reverse was also used: testing for the presence of thiocyanate by the addition of ferric salts. The identification of the chromophore in these tests remains complicated. The 1:1 complex of thiocyanate and iron is deeply red. The effect was first reported in 1826. The structure of this species has never been confirmed by X-ray crystallography. The test is largely archaic.

Copper(I) thiocyanate is a reagent for the conversion of aryl diazonium salts to arylthiocyanates, a version of the Sandmeyer reaction.

=== Enzymatic substrate ===
Since it occurs naturally, thiocyanate unsurprisingly serves as a substrate for some enzymes. Two metalloenzymes, thiocyanate hydrolases, catalyze the hydrolysis of thiocyanate. A cobalt-containing hydrolase catalyzes its conversion to carbonyl sulfide:

SCN^{−} + H_{2}O + H^{+} → COS + NH_{3}

A copper-containing thiocyanate hydrolase catalyzes its conversion to cyanate:

SCN^{−} + H_{2}O → OCN^{−} + H_{2}S

In both cases, metal–SCN complexes are invoked as intermediates. Although unlikely as a natural substrate, thiocyanate is a substrate for nitrogenase, being reduced to hydrogen sulfide, methane, and other products.

== Synthesis ==
Almost all thiocyanate complexes are prepared from thiocyanate salts using ligand substitution reactions. Typical thiocyanate sources include ammonium thiocyanate and potassium thiocyanate.

An unusual route to thiocyanate complexes involves oxidative addition of thiocyanogen to low valent metal complexes:

Ru(PPh_{3})_{2}(CO)_{3} + (SCN)_{2} → Ru(NCS)_{2}(PPh_{3})_{2}(CO)_{2} + CO, where Ph = C_{6}H_{5}

Even though the reaction involves cleavage of the S–S bond in thiocyanogen, the product is the Ru–NCS linkage isomer.

In another unusual method, thiocyanate functions as both a ligand and as a reductant in its reaction with dichromate to give [Cr(NCS)_{4}(NH_{3})_{2}]^{−}. In this conversion, Cr(VI) converts to Cr(III).
