= Lead(II) thiocyanate =

Names
- IUPAC name Lead(II) thiocyanate
- Systematic IUPAC name Lead(II) thiocyanate
- Other names Lead dithiocyanate, lead isothiocyanate, lead sulfocyanate, lead thiocyanate, lead thiocyanate (Pb(SCN) 2), lead(II) thiocyanate, lead(II) thiocyanate (Pb(NCS) 2), thiocyanic acid, lead(2+) salt

Identifiers
CAS Number	592-87-0
3D model (JSmol)	Interactive image
ChemSpider	11127
ECHA InfoCard	100.008.887
EC Number	209-774-6
PubChem CID	11616
UNII	7977FZ765Q
CompTox Dashboard (EPA)	DTXSID90890513
- InChI: InChI=1S/2CHNS.Pb/c2*2-1-3;/h2*3H;/q;;+2/p-2 Key: VRNINGUKUJWZTH-UHFFFAOYSA-L
- SMILES: C(#N)[S-].C(#N)[S-].[Pb+2]

Properties
Chemical formula	Pb(SCN)_{2}
Molar mass	323.3648 g/mol
Appearance	white or light yellow powder
Odor	odorless
Density	3.82 g/cm^{3}
Melting point	190 °C (374 °F; 463 K)
Solubility in water	0.553 g/100 mL
Solubility	soluble in nitric acid
Magnetic susceptibility (χ)	−82.0·10^{−6} cm^{3}/mol

Hazards
- GHS labelling
Pictograms	(GHS07: Exclamation mark) (GHS08: Health hazard) (GHS09: Environmental hazard)
Signal word	Danger
Hazard statements	H302, H312, H332, H360, H373, H410
Precautionary statements	P201, P202, P260, P264, P270, P271, P273, P280, P281, P301+P312, P302+P352, P304+P312, P304+P340, P308+P313, P312, P314, P322, P330, P363, P391, P405, P501
NFPA 704 (fire diamond)	1 1 1
- Except where otherwise noted, data are given for materials in their standard state (at 25 °C [77 °F], 100 kPa). compounds:11&page2=Lead%28II%29+thiocyanate verify (what is ?) Infobox references

Lead(II) thiocyanate is a compound, more precisely a salt, with the formula Pb(SCN)_{2}. It is a white crystalline solid, but will turn yellow upon exposure to light. It is slightly soluble in water and can be converted to a basic salt (Pb(CNS)_{2}·Pb(OH)_{2} when boiled. Salt crystals may form upon cooling. Lead thiocyanate can cause lead poisoning if ingested and can adversely react with many substances. It has use in small explosives, matches, and dyeing.

Lead(II) thiocyanate is reasonably soluble at room temperature, thus it may be difficult to identify in a solution with low concentration of lead(II) thiocyanate.

== Synthesis ==
Lead(II) thiocyanate can be formed from the acidification of lead(II) nitrate, Pb(NO_{3})_{2}, with nitric acid, HNO_{3}, in the presence of thiocyanic acid, HSCN. It may also be made by reacting lead(II) acetate (Pb(CH_{3}COO)_{2}) solved in water with either potassium thiocyanate (KSCN) or ammonium thiocyanate (NH_{4}SCN), thus causing a white precipitation of solid lead(II) thiocyanate according to the ion reaction:

Pb^{2+}(aq) + 2SCN^{−}(aq) → Pb(SCN)_{2}(s)

According to X-ray crystallography, the anhydrous salt is a coordination polymer. The Pb^{2+} ions are each bonded to eight thiocyanate anions, with four Pb-S and four Pb-N bonds. The motif is reminiscent of the fluorite structure. Strontium thiocyanate, calcium thiocyanate, and barium thiocyanate adopt the same structure.

== Reactivity ==
When exposed to UV or visible light, lead thiocyanate will turn yellow due to the presence of sulfur. It is violently oxidized by nitric acid and will release highly toxic hydrogen cyanide gas on contact with acid. At high temperatures it releases sulfur dioxide gas. Like other metal cyanides, it explodes on heating when mixed with sodium nitrate.

== Health hazards ==
Skin and eye irritant, can induce lead poisoning by ingestion or inhalation.

Symptoms include gastrointestinal disorders, irritation of digestive tract, leg cramps, muscle weakness, paresthesia. High doses can result in coma or death. Symptoms present in 1 to 2 days.

== Uses ==
Lead thiocyanate is used in explosives, specifically an ingredient in primers for small-arms cartridges, safety matches, and to reverse aniline black dyeing (Gideon). It can also be used as a precursor for preparing perovskite solar cells.

== See also ==
- Lead
