= Copper(I) thiocyanate =

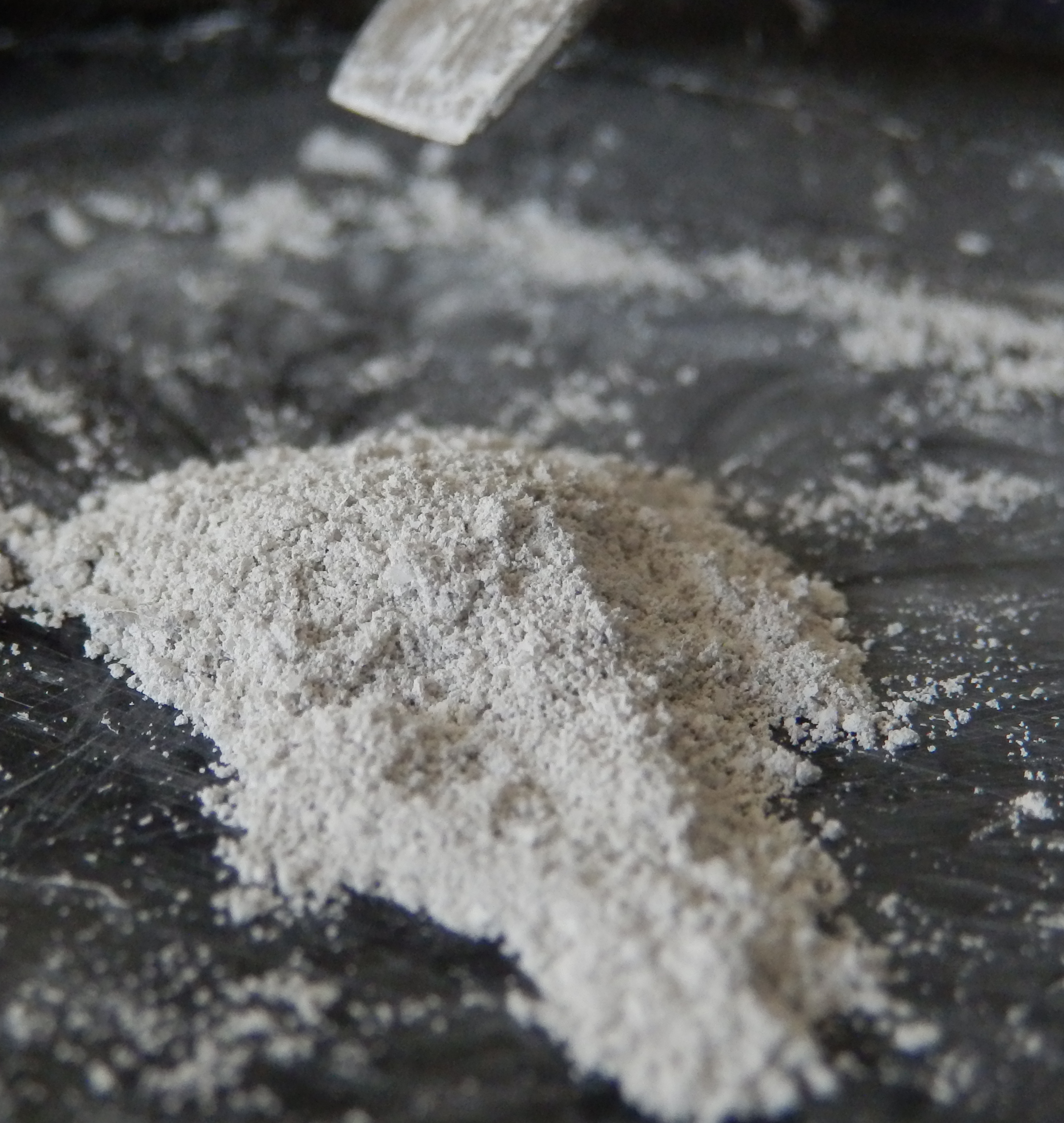
- Copper(I) thiocyanate

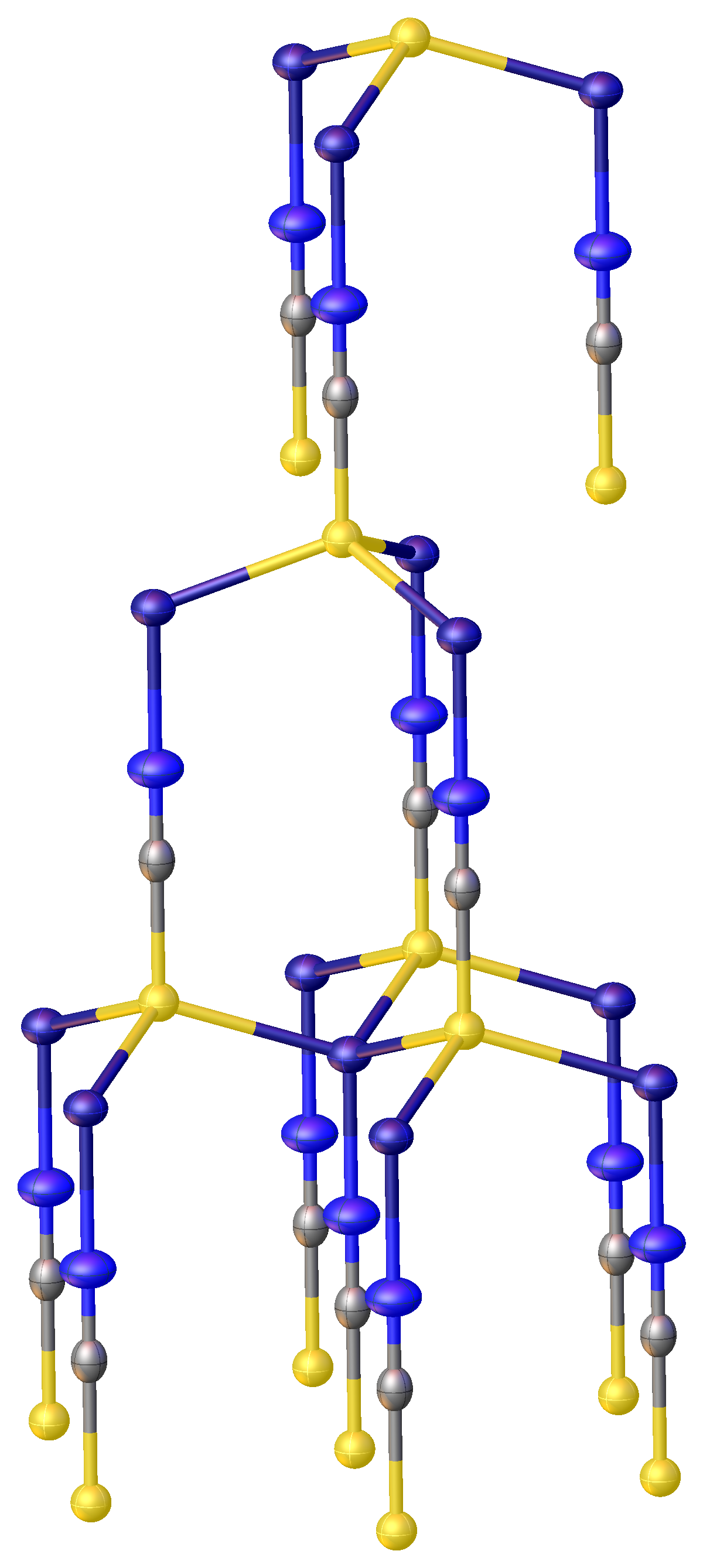

Names
- Other names Cuprous thiocyanate

Identifiers
CAS Number	1111-67-7
3D model (JSmol)	Interactive image
ChemSpider	55204
ECHA InfoCard	100.012.894
EC Number	214-183-1
PubChem CID	11029823
UNII	PW2155WE9H
CompTox Dashboard (EPA)	DTXSID0034481
- InChI: InChI=1S/CHNS.Cu/c2-1-3;/h3H;/q;+1/p-1 Key: PDZKZMQQDCHTNF-UHFFFAOYSA-M
- SMILES: C(#N)[S-].[Cu+]

Properties
Chemical formula	CuSCN
Molar mass	121.628 g/mol
Appearance	white powder
Density	2.88 g/cm^{3}
Melting point	1,084 °C (1,983 °F; 1,357 K)
Solubility in water	8.427·10^{−7} g/L (20 °C)
Solubility product (K_{sp})	1.77×10^{−13}
Magnetic susceptibility (χ)	−48.0·10^{−6} cm^{3}/mol

Related compounds
Other anions	Copper(I) iodide, copper(I) cyanide
Other cations	Copper(II) thiocyanate Ammonium thiocyanate Potassium thiocyanate
- Except where otherwise noted, data are given for materials in their standard state (at 25 °C [77 °F], 100 kPa). Infobox references

Copper(I) thiocyanate (or cuprous thiocyanate) is a coordination polymer with formula CuSCN. It is an air-stable, white solid used as a precursor for the preparation of other thiocyanate salts.

== Structure ==
At least two polymorphs have been characterized by X-ray crystallography. They both feature copper(I) in a characteristic tetrahedral coordination geometry. The sulfur end of the SCN- ligand is triply bridging so that the coordination sphere for copper is CuS_{3}N.

== Synthesis ==
Copper(I) thiocyanate forms from the spontaneous decomposition of black copper(II) thiocyanate, releasing thiocyanogen, especially when heated. It is also formed from copper(II) thiocyanate under water, releasing (among others) thiocyanic acid and the highly poisonous hydrogen cyanide. It is conveniently prepared from relatively dilute solutions of copper(II) in water, such as copper(II) sulphate. To a copper(II) solution sulphurous acid is added and then a soluble thiocyanate is added (preferably slowly, while stirring). Copper(I) thiocyanate is precipitated as a white powder. Alternatively, a thiosulfate solution may be used as a reducing agent.

== Double salts ==
Copper(I) thiocyanate forms one double salt with the group 1 elements, CsCu(SCN)_{2}. The double salt only forms from concentrated solutions of CsSCN, into which CuSCN dissolves. From less concentrated solutions, solid CuSCN separates reflecting its low solubility. When brought together with potassium, sodium or barium thiocyanate, and brought to crystallisation by concentrating the solution, mixed salts will crystallise out. These are not considered true double salts. As with CsCu(SNC)_{2}, copper(I) thiocyanate separates out when these mixed salts are redissolved or their solutions diluted.

== Uses ==
Copper(I) thiocyanate is a hole conductor, a semiconductor with a wide band gap (3.6 eV, therefore transparent to visible and near infrared light). It is used in photovoltaics in some third-generation cells as a hole transfer layer. It acts as a P-type semiconductor and as a solid-state electrolyte. It is often used in dye-sensitized solar cells. Its hole conductivity is however relatively poor (0.01 S·m^{−1}). This can be improved by various treatments, e.g. exposure to gaseous chlorine or doping with (SCN)_{2}.

CuSCN and NiO act synergistically as a smoke suppressant additive in polyvinyl chloride (PVC).

CuSCN precipitated on carbon support can be used for conversion of aryl halides to aryl thiocyanates.

Copper(I) thiocyanate is used in some anti-fouling paints. Advantages compared to cuprous oxide include that the compound is white and a more efficient biocide.
