= Strontium thiocyanate =

Water-soluble salt

- Sr^{2+} [N≡C−S^{−}]_{2}

Identifiers
CAS Number	18807-10-8
3D model (JSmol)	Interactive image
ChemSpider	57450760
PubChem CID	57370878
CompTox Dashboard (EPA)	DTXSID90724809
- InChI: InChI=1S/2CHNS.Sr/c2*2-1-3;/h2*3H;/q;;+2/p-2 Key: YNQRWDDCTKWYJP-UHFFFAOYSA-L
- SMILES: C(#N)[S-].C(#N)[S-].[Sr+2]

Properties
Chemical formula	C_{2}N_{2}S_{2}Sr
Molar mass	203.78 g·mol^{−1}
Appearance	white solid
Melting point	331–379 °C (decomposes at 650 °C)

Structure
Crystal structure	Monoclinic
Space group	C2/c
Point group	2/m
Lattice constant	a = 9.86 Å, b = 6.63 Å, c = 8.20 Å α = 90°, β = 91.3°, γ = 90°
Formula units (Z)	4
- Except where otherwise noted, data are given for materials in their standard state (at 25 °C [77 °F], 100 kPa). Infobox references

Strontium thiocyanate refers to the salt Sr(SCN)_{2}. It is a colorless solid. According to X-ray crystallography, it is a coordination polymer. The Sr^{2+} ions are each coordinated to eight thiocyanate anions in a distorted square antiprismatic molecular geometry where each square face contains two adjacent S atoms and two adjacent N atoms. The motif is reminiscent of the fluorite structure. The same structure is observed for Ca(SCN)_{2}, Ba(SCN)_{2}, and Pb(SCN)_{2}.

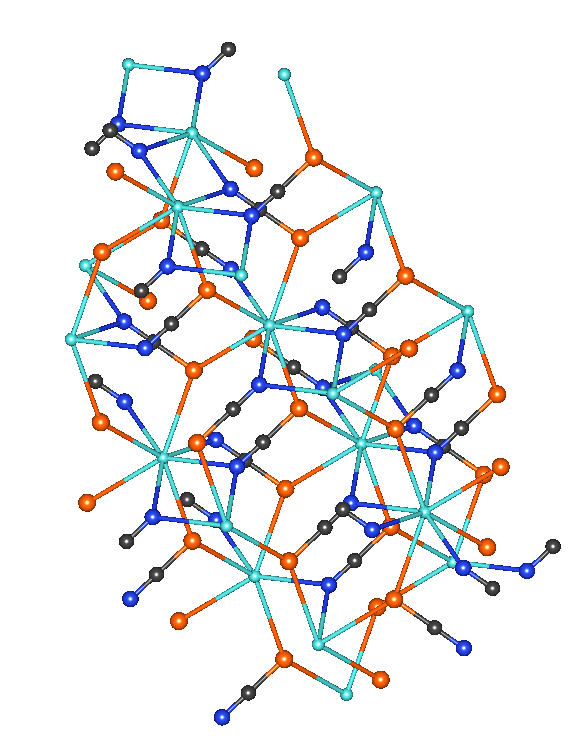
Solid Sr(SCN)_{2} has a complicated polymeric structure as is revealed by this image of a fragment of the lattice. Color code: Sr = turquoise, N = blue, C = gray, S = orange.
