= Thiocyanogen =

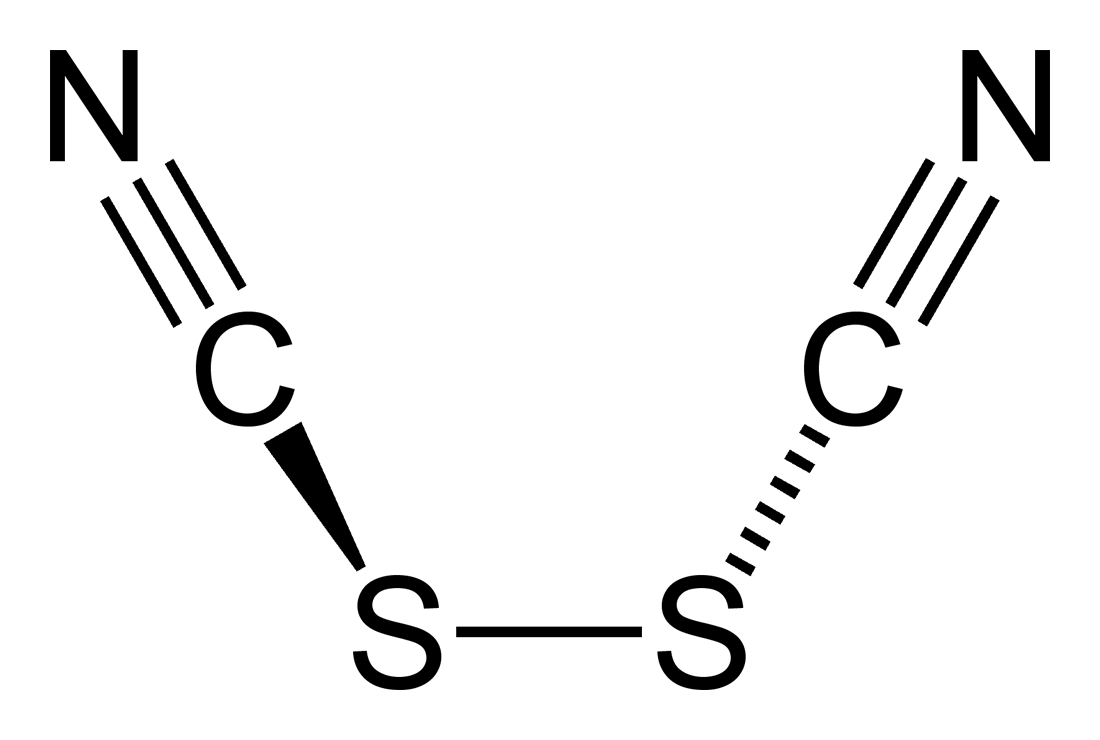

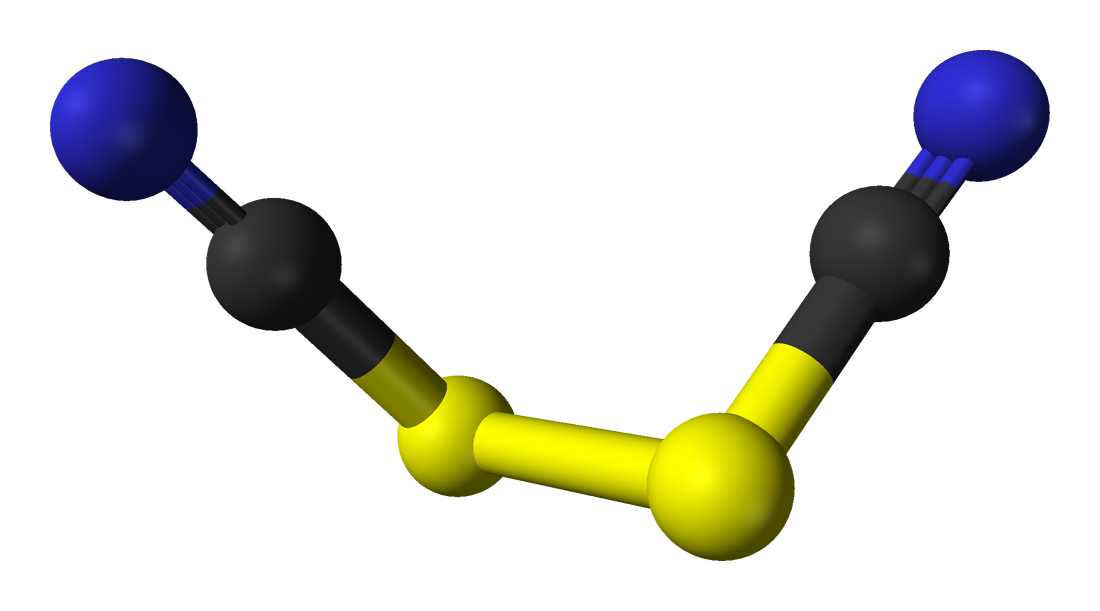

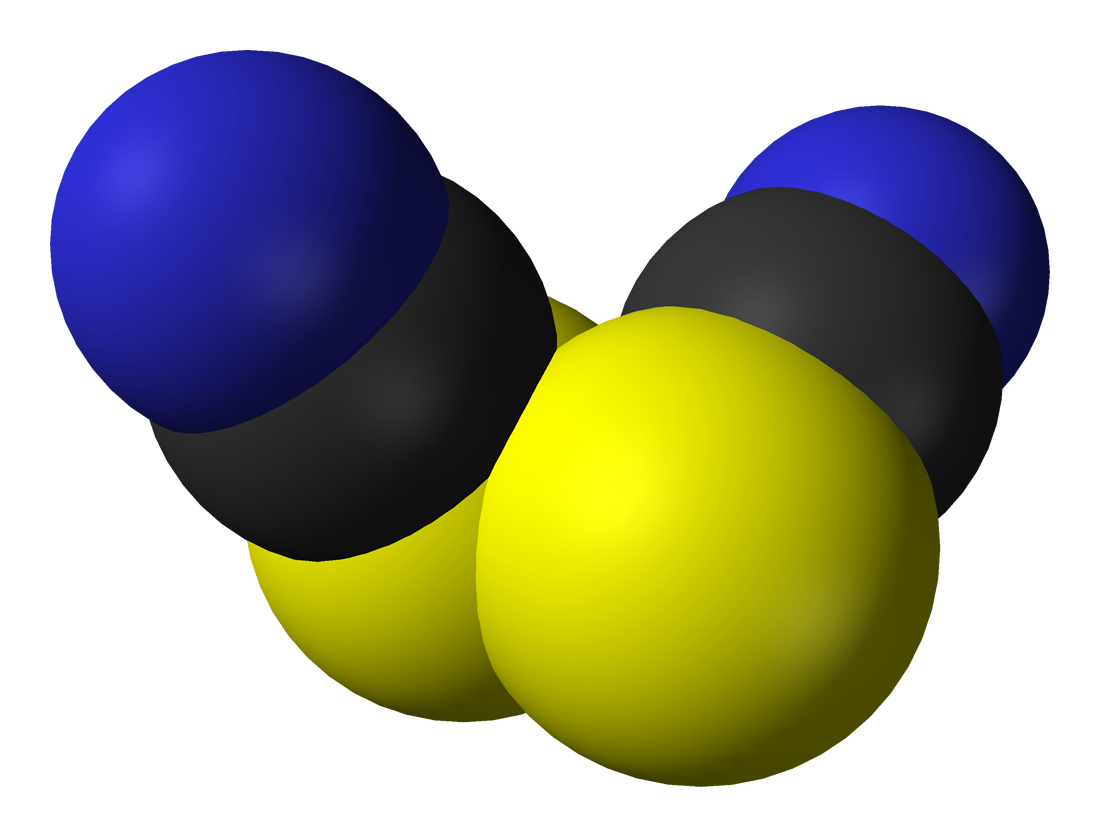

Names
- Preferred IUPAC name Cyanic dithioperoxyanhydride
- Other names Dicyanodisulfane

Identifiers
CAS Number	505-14-6
3D model (JSmol)	Interactive image
ChEBI	CHEBI:30063
ChemSpider	61468
PubChem CID	68160
UNII	9ME5949L1M
CompTox Dashboard (EPA)	DTXSID60198513
- InChI: InChI=1S/C2N2S2/c3-1-5-6-2-4 Key: DTMHTVJOHYTUHE-UHFFFAOYSA-N; InChI=1/C2N2S2/c3-1-5-6-2-4 Key: DTMHTVJOHYTUHE-UHFFFAOYAE
- SMILES: N#CSSC#N

Properties
Chemical formula	C_{2}N_{2}S_{2}
Molar mass	116.16 g mol^{−1}
Appearance	Colorless crystal or liquid
Melting point	−2.5 °C (27.5 °F; 270.6 K)
Boiling point	≈20 °C (decomposes)
- Except where otherwise noted, data are given for materials in their standard state (at 25 °C [77 °F], 100 kPa). verify (what is ?) Infobox references

Thiocyanogen, (SCN)_{2}, is a pseudohalogen derived from the pseudohalide thiocyanate, [SCN]^{−}, with behavior intermediate between dibromine and diiodine. This hexatomic compound exhibits C_{2} point group symmetry and has the connectivity NCS-SCN.

In the lungs, lactoperoxidase may oxidize thiocyanate to thiocyanogen or hypothiocyanite.

== History ==
Berzelius first proposed that thiocyanogen ought exist as part of his radical theory, but the compound's isolation proved problematic. Liebig pursued a wide variety of synthetic routes for the better part of a century, but, even with Wöhler's assistance, only succeeded in producing a complex mixture with the proportions of thiocyanic acid. In 1861, Linnemann generated appreciable quantities of thiocyanogen from a silver thiocyanate suspension in diethyl ether and excess iodine, but misidentified the minor product as sulfur iodide cyanide (ISCN). Indeed, that reaction suffers from competing equilibria attributed to the weak oxidizing power of iodine; the major product is sulfur dicyanide. The following year, Schneider produced thiocyangen from silver thiocyanate and disulfur dichloride, but the product disproportionated to sulfur and trisulfur dicyanides.

The subject then lay fallow until the 1910s, when Niels Bjerrum began investigating gold thiocyanate complexes. Some eliminated reductively and reversibly, whereas others appeared to irreversibly generate cyanide and sulfate salt solutions. Understanding the process required reanalyzing the decomposition of thiocyanogen using the then-new techniques of physical chemistry. Bjerrum's work revealed that water catalyzed thiocyanogen's decomposition via hypothiocyanous acid. Moreover, the oxidation potential of thiocyanogen appeared to be 0.769 V, slightly greater than iodine but less than bromine. In 1919, Söderbäck successfully isolated stable thiocyanogen from oxidation of plumbous thiocyanate with bromine.

== Preparation ==
Modern syntheses typically differ little from Söderbäck's process. Thiocyanogen synthesis begins when aqueous solutions of lead(II) nitrate and sodium thiocyanate, combined, precipitate plumbous thiocyanate. Treating an anhydrous Pb(SCN)_{2} suspension in glacial acetic acid with bromine then affords a 0.1M solution of thiocyanogen that is stable for days. Alternatively, a solution of bromine in methylene chloride is added to a suspension of Pb(SCN)_{2} in methylene chloride at 0 °C.

Pb(SCN)_{2} + Br_{2} → (SCN)_{2} + PbBr_{2}

In either case, the oxidation is exothermic.

An alternative technique is the thermal decomposition of cupric thiocyanate at 35–80 °C:

2Cu(SCN)_{2} → 2 CuSCN + (SCN)_{2}

== Reactions ==
In general, thiocyanogen is stored in solution, as the pure compound explodes above 20 °C to a red-orange polymer. However, the sulfur atoms disproportionate in water:

3(SCN)_{2} + 4H_{2}O → H_{2}SO_{4} + HCN + 5HSCN

Thiocyanogen is a weak electrophile, attacking only highly activated (phenolic or anilinic) or polycyclic arenes. It attacks carbonyls at the α position. Heteratoms are attacked more easily, and the compound thiocyanates sulfur, nitrogen, and various poor metals. Thiocyanogen solutions in nonpolar solvents react almost completely with chlorine to give chlorine thiocyanate; but the corresponding bromine thiocyanate is unstable above −50 °C, forming polymeric thiocyanogen and bromine.

The compound adds trans to alkenes to give 1,2-bis(thiocyanato) compounds; the intermediate thiiranium ion can be trapped with many nucleophiles. Radical polymerization is the most likely side-reaction, and yields improve when cold and dark. However, the addition reaction is slow, and light may be necessary to accelerate the process. Titanacyclopentadienes give (Z,Z)-1,4-bis(thiocyanato)-1,3-butadienes, which in turn can be converted to 1,2-dithiins. Thiocyanogen only adds once to alkynes; the resulting dithioacyloin dicyanate is not particularly olefinic.

Selenocyanogen, (SeCN)_{2}, prepared from reaction of silver selenocyanate with iodine in tetrahydrofuran at 0 °C, reacts in a similar manner to thiocyanogen.

== Applications ==
Thiocyanogen has been used to estimate the degree of unsaturation in fatty acids, similar to the iodine value.
