= Lithium thiocyanate =

- Li^{+} [N≡C−S^{−}]

Names
- Other names: Lithium sulfocyanate

Identifiers
CAS Number	556-65-0; monohydrate: 123333-85-7; dihydrate: 84372-58-7
3D model (JSmol)	Interactive image; monohydrate: Interactive image; dihydrate: Interactive image
ChemSpider	141057; monohydrate: 13998125
ECHA InfoCard	100.008.306
EC Number	209-135-1; monohydrate: 629-475-8
PubChem CID	23673451; monohydrate: 16211966; dihydrate: 129843620
CompTox Dashboard (EPA)	DTXSID40883339
- InChI: InChI=1S/CHNS.Li/c2-1-3;/h3H;/q;+1/p-1 Key: ZJZXSOKJEJFHCP-UHFFFAOYSA-M; monohydrate: InChI=1S/CHNS.Li.H2O/c2-1-3;;/h3H;;1H2/q;+1;/p-1 Key: UNTVNJAFDYEXLD-UHFFFAOYSA-M; dihydrate: InChI=1S/CHNS.Li.2H2O/c2-1-3;;;/h3H;;2*1H2/q;+1;;/p-1 Key: TWRGRNSGEYGNBV-UHFFFAOYSA-M
- SMILES: [Li+].C(#N)[S-]; monohydrate: [Li+].C(#N)[S-].O; dihydrate: [Li+].C(#N)[S-].O.O

Properties
Chemical formula	LiSCN
Molar mass	65.02 g/mol
Appearance	White hygroscopic solid
Density	1.44 g/cm^{3}
Melting point	274 °C (525 °F; 547 K)
Boiling point	550 °C (1,022 °F; 823 K) (decomposition)
Solubility in water	125 g/100 ml
Solubility	Soluble in alcohol

Structure
Crystal structure	Orthorhombic (anhydrous, α-monohydrate, dihydrate); Monoclinic (β-monohydrate)
Space group	C2/m (α-monohydrate); Pnam (β-monohydrate); Pnma (anhydrous, dihydrate)
Lattice constant	a = 1215.1 pm, b = 373.6 pm, c = 529.9 pm (anhydrous)
Coordination geometry	4 (α, β-monohydrate); 6 (anhydrous, dihydrate)
Molecular shape	Tetrahedral (α and β-monohydrate)

Thermochemistry
Std molar entropy (S^{⦵}_{298})	38 J/(K·mol) (9 e.u.)
Std enthalpy of formation (Δ_{f}H^{⦵}_{298})	21 kJ/mol (5.0 kcal/mol)

Hazards
- GHS labelling
Pictograms	(GHS07: Exclamation mark)
Signal word	Warning
Hazard statements	H302+H312+H332, H412
NFPA 704 (fire diamond)	4 1 1

Related compounds
Other cations	Sodium thiocyanate, Potassium thiocyanate
- Except where otherwise noted, data are given for materials in their standard state (at 25 °C [77 °F], 100 kPa). Infobox references

Lithium thiocyanate is a chemical compound with the formula LiSCN. It is an extremely hygroscopic white solid that forms the monohydrate and the dihydrate. It is the least stable of the alkali metal thiocyanates due to the large electrostatic deforming field of the lithium cation.

== Properties and preparation ==
Lithium thiocyanate is hygroscopic and forms the anhydrous, monohydrate, and dihydrate, which melts at 274, 60, and 38 °C, respectively. The monohydrate supercools after melting, as it recrystallizes at 36 °C. It is soluble in many organic solvents, such as ethanol, methanol, 1-propanol, and acetone. However, it is insoluble in benzene.

Due to its hygroscopicity, the anhydrous form is hard to prepare. The anhydrous form is usually prepared by the reaction of lithium hydroxide and ammonium thiocyanate, then the water was removed by vacuum, then the resulting solid was dissolved in diethyl ether, followed by adding to petroleum ether to form the ether salt, then it was heated in vacuum at 110 °C to result in the anhydrous salt. The overall reaction is the following:

LiOH + NH_{4}SCN → LiSCN + NH_{4}OH

The ether can be replaced by THF.

== Crystallography ==
The monohydrate has 2 forms, the α form, and the β form; the α form reversibly converts to the β form at 49 °C. The α form has the space group C2/m while the β form has the space group Pnam. More info on its crystallography are listed in the table below.

Crystallographic data for the 4 forms of lithium thiocyanate
Compound	LiSCN	α-LiSCN·H_{2}O	β-LiSCN·H_{2}O	LiSCN·2H_{2}O
Molar mass (g/mol)	65.02	83.04	83.04	101.05
Crystal Structure	Orthorhombic	Orthorhombic	Monoclinic	Orthorhombic
Space Group	Pnma	C2/m	Pnam	Pnma
Lattice constant a (Å)	12.151	15.027	13.226	5.721
Lattice constant b (Å)	3.736	7.597	7.062	8.093
Lattice constant c (Å)	5.299	6.707	8.166	9.66.9
β			96.147°	
Coordination number	6	4	4	6
Calculated density (g/cm^{3})	1.80	1.45	1.45	1.50
