= Sulfur dicyanide =

Identifiers
CAS Number	627-52-1
3D model (JSmol)	Interactive image
ChemSpider	120218
PubChem CID	136447
CompTox Dashboard (EPA)	DTXSID70211767
- InChI: InChI=1S/C2N2S/c3-1-5-2-4 Key: RFMQOHXWHFHOJF-UHFFFAOYSA-N
- SMILES: C(#N)SC#N

Properties
Chemical formula	C_{2}N_{2}S
Molar mass	84.10 g·mol^{−1}
Appearance	white solid
Density	1.48 g/cm^{3}
Melting point	62.3 °C (144.1 °F; 335.4 K)
Sublimation conditions	30–40 °C, 1 atm
- Except where otherwise noted, data are given for materials in their standard state (at 25 °C [77 °F], 100 kPa). Infobox references

Sulfur dicyanide is an inorganic compound with the formula S(CN)_{2}. A white, slightly unstable solid, the compound is mainly of theoretical and fundamental interest given its simplicity. It is the first member of the dicyanosulfanes S_{x}(CN)_{2}, which includes thiocyanogen ((SCN)_{2}) and higher polysulfanes up to S_{4}(CN)_{2}. According to X-ray crystallography, the molecule is planar, the SCN units are linear, with an S-C-S angle of 95.6°.

Sulfur dicyanide begins to sublime at 30-40 °C and melts at 60 °C. Under an inert atmosphere, it slowly decomposes to a yellow polymer at room temperature with a rate increasing in temperature. The compound is unstable in acid, disproportionating to thiocyanate, cyanate, sulfate, and cyanide, and neutral moisture induces decomposition to thiocyanic and cyanic acids. Stable solutions are possible in many organic solvents.

Sulfur dicyanide was first synthesized by Lassaigne in 1828 from silver cyanide and sulfur dichloride. Subsequent developments include Linneman's discovery that the same product arose from silver thiocyanate and cyanogen iodide, and Söderbäck's extensive analysis of reactions between metal cyanides and sulfur halides. Linneman also discovered that the cyano moieties of sulfur dicyanide add ammonia à la Pinner to give an amidine without displacing the S–C linkage; contrariwise dimethylamine induces decomposition to dimethylcyanamide and dimethylammonium thiocyanate.

Sulfur dicyanide generally reacts with noble metals to give heteroleptic cyano-thiocyano complices, although in rare cases it can ligate without decomposition, e.g.:

Ir(CO)(PPh_{3})_{2}Cl + NCSCN → Ir(CO)(CN)(SCN)(PPh_{3})_{2}Cl
Ir(N_{2})(PPh_{3})_{2}Cl + S(CN)_{2} → Ir(S(CN)_{2})(PPh_{3})_{2}Cl
