= CH4N2S =

The molecular formula CH_{4}N_{2}S (molar mass: 76.12 g/mol, exact mass: 76.0095 u) may refer to:

- Ammonium thiocyanate
- Thiourea
