= Copper(II) thiocyanate =

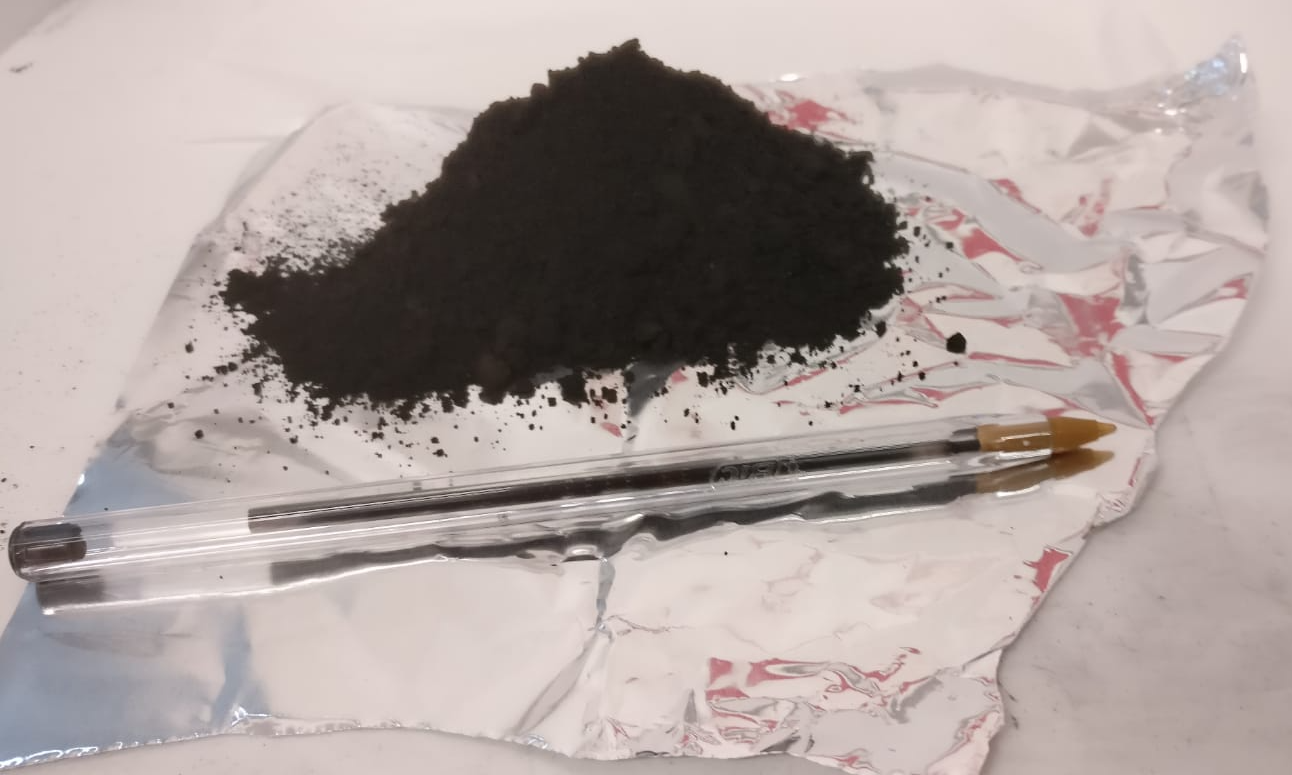
- Copper(II) thiocyanate

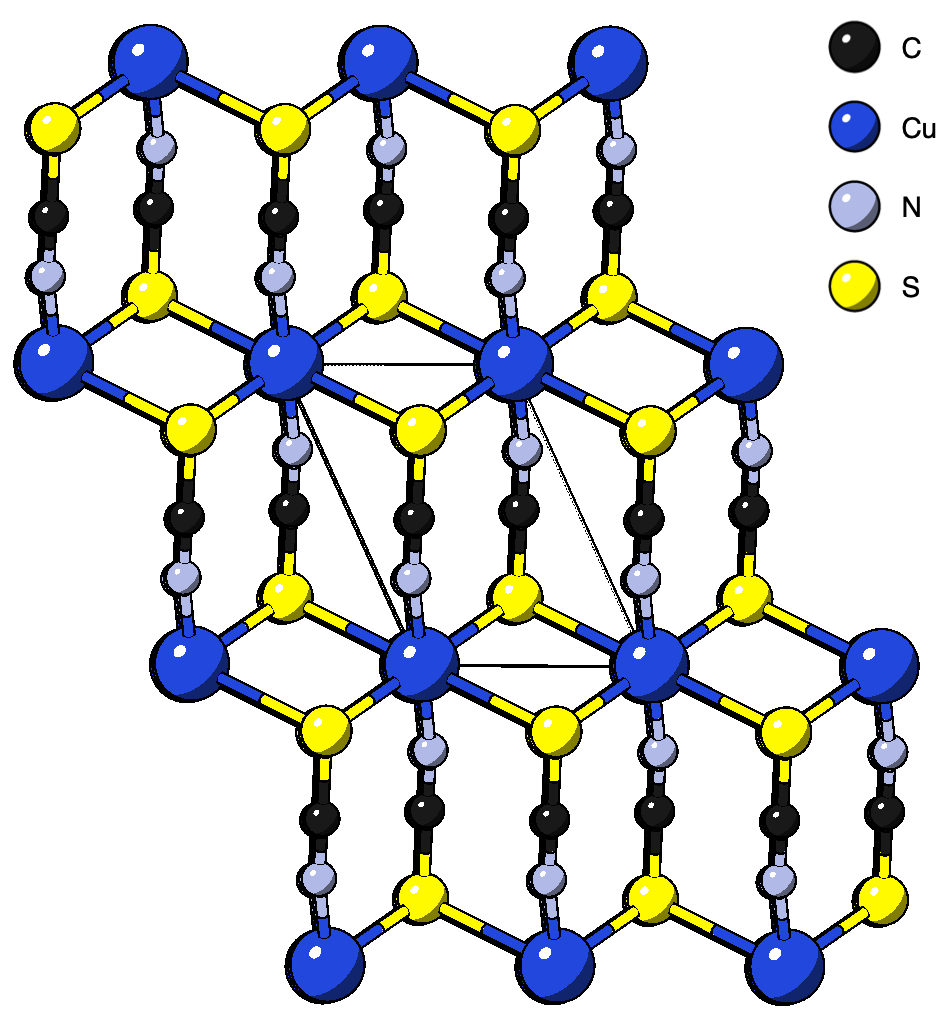
- Crystal structure of copper(II) thiocyanate

Names
- Other names Cupric thiocyanate

Identifiers
| CAS Number | 15192-76-4 |
| 3D model (JSmol) | Interactive image |
| ChemSpider | 8279278 |
| PubChem CID | 10103751 |
| CompTox Dashboard (EPA) | DTXSID001337084 |
- InChI: InChI=1S/2CHNS.Cu/c2*2-1-3;/h2*3H;/q;;+2/p-2 Key: BQVVSSAWECGTRN-UHFFFAOYSA-L
- SMILES: C(#N)[S-].C(#N)[S-].[Cu+2]

Properties
| Chemical formula | Cu(SCN)_{2} |
| Molar mass | 179.71 g/mol |
| Appearance | black powder |
| Density | 2.47 g/cm^{3} |
| Melting point | decomposes at 180 °C |
| Solubility in water | Insoluble |
| Magnetic susceptibility (χ) | 0.66×10^{−3} cm^{3}/mol |

Related compounds
| Other anions | Copper(II) bromide; Copper(II) chloride |
| Other cations | Copper(I) thiocyanate; Cobalt(II) thiocyanate; Mercury(II) thiocyanate; Ammonium thiocyanate; Potassium thiocyanate |
- Except where otherwise noted, data are given for materials in their standard state (at 25 °C [77 °F], 100 kPa). Infobox references

Copper(II) thiocyanate (or cupric thiocyanate) is a coordination polymer with formula Cu(SCN)_{2}. It is a black solid which slowly decomposes in moist air.

== Properties ==
Copper(II) thiocyanate, like copper(II) bromide and copper(II) chloride, is a quasi low-dimensional antiferromagnet and it orders at 12 K (−261 °C) into a conventional Néel ground state.

== Structure ==
The structure of Cu(SCN)_{2} was determined via powder X-ray diffraction and consists of chains of Cu(NCS)_{2} linked together by weak Cu–S–Cu bonds into two-dimensional layers. It can be considered a Jahn–Teller distorted analogue of the mercury thiocyanate structure-type. Each copper is octahedrally coordinated by four sulfurs and two nitrogens. The sulfur end of the SCN^{−} ligand is doubly bridging.

== Synthesis ==
Copper(II) thiocyanate can be prepared from the reaction of concentrated solutions of copper(II) and a soluble thiocyanate salt in water, precipitating as a black powder. With rapid drying, pure Cu(SCN)_{2} can be isolated. Reaction at lower concentrations and for longer periods of time generates instead copper(I) thiocyanate.

== History ==
It was first reported in 1838 by Karl Ernst Claus and its structure was determined first in 2018.
