= Cobalt(II) thiocyanate =

- Co^{2+} [N≡C−S^{−}]_{2}
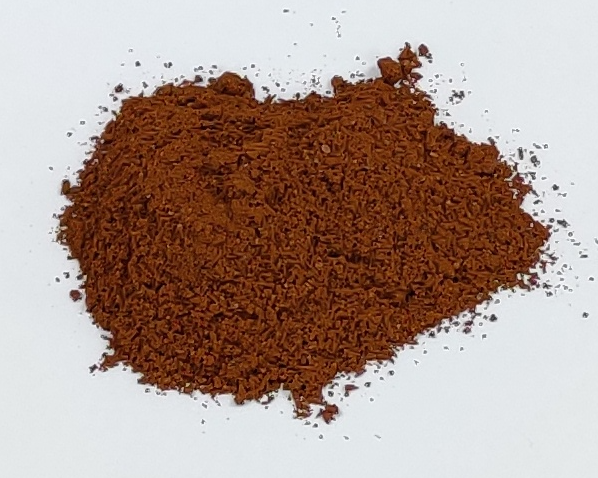

Identifiers
CAS Number	3017-60-5; 61497-93-6 (trihydrate)
3D model (JSmol)	Interactive image
ChemSpider	17166
ECHA InfoCard	100.019.234
EC Number	221-156-8
PubChem CID	18174
UNII	Q59BVN759I
CompTox Dashboard (EPA)	DTXSID00890569
- InChI: InChI=1S/2CHNS.Co/c2*2-1-3;/h2*3H;/q;;+2/p-2 Key: INDBQWVYFLTCFF-UHFFFAOYSA-L; InChI=1/2CHNS.Co/c2*2-1-3;/h2*3H;/q;;+2/p-2 Key: INDBQWVYFLTCFF-NUQVWONBAI
- SMILES: C(#N)[S-].C(#N)[S-].[Co+2]

Properties
Chemical formula	C_{2}CoN_{2}S_{2}
Molar mass	175.098 g/mol
Density	2.484 g/cm^{3}
Magnetic susceptibility (χ)	+11,090·10^{−6} cm^{3}/mol

Hazards
- GHS labelling
Pictograms	(GHS07: Exclamation mark) (GHS09: Environmental hazard)
Signal word	Warning
Hazard statements	H302, H312, H332, H410
Precautionary statements	P261, P264, P270, P271, P273, P280, P301+P312, P302+P352, P304+P312, P304+P340, P312, P322, P330, P363, P391, P501
Safety data sheet (SDS)	External MSDS

Related compounds
Other anions	Cobalt(II) cyanate
- Except where otherwise noted, data are given for materials in their standard state (at 25 °C [77 °F], 100 kPa). verify (what is ?) Infobox references

Cobalt(II) thiocyanate is an inorganic compound with the formula Co(SCN)_{2}. The anhydrous compound is a coordination polymer with a layered structure. The trihydrate, Co(SCN)_{2}(H_{2}O)_{3}, is a isothiocyanate complex used in the cobalt thiocyanate test (or Scott test) for detecting cocaine.

== Structure and preparation ==
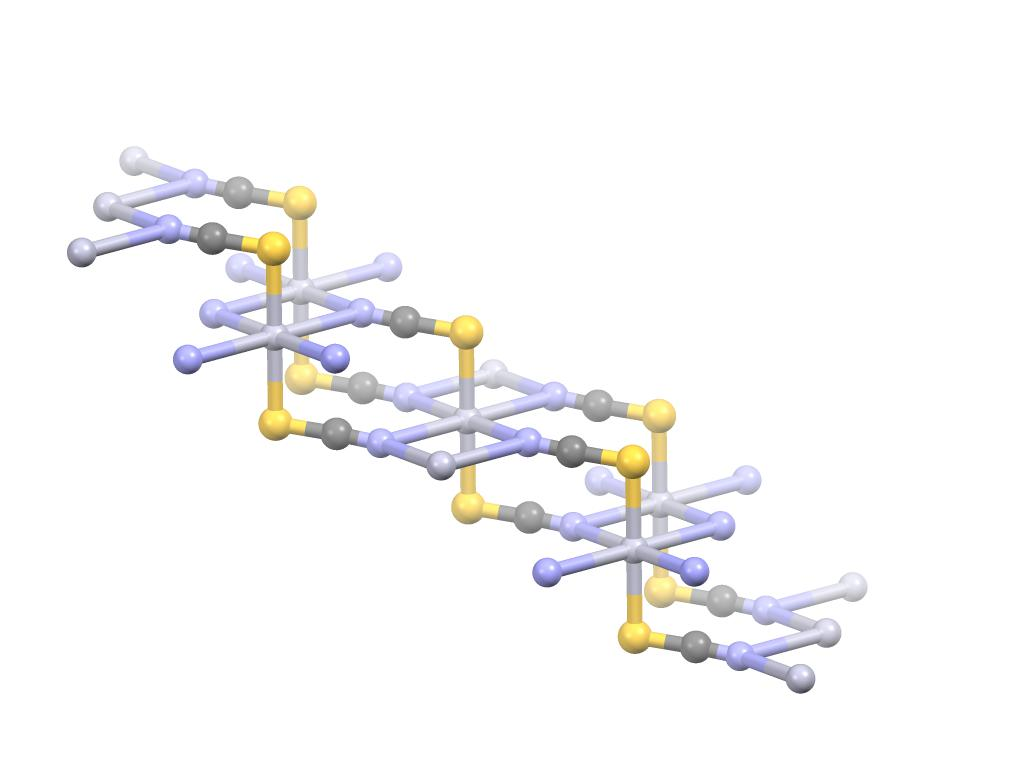
Structure of Co(SCN)_{2}.

The structures of Co(SCN)_{2} and its hydrate Co(SCN)_{2}(H_{2}O)_{3} have been determined using X-ray crystallography. Co(SCN)_{2} forms infinite 2D sheets as in the mercury(II) thiocyanate structure type, where as Co(SCN)_{2}(H_{2}O)_{3} consists of isolated tetrahedral Co(SCN)_{2}(H_{2}O)_{2} centers and one equivalent of water of crystallization.

The hydrate may be prepared by the salt metathesis reactions, such as the reaction of aqueous cobalt(II) sulfate and barium thiocyanate to produce a barium sulfate precipitate, leaving the hydrate of Co(SCN)_{2} in solution:

CoSO_{4} + Ba(SCN)_{2} → BaSO_{4} + Co(SCN)_{2}

or the reaction of the hexakisacetonitrile cobalt(II) tetrafluoroborate and potassium thiocyanate, precipitating KBF_{4}

[Co(NCMe)_{6}](BF_{4})_{2} + 2KSCN → 2KBF_{4} + Co(SCN)_{2}.

The anhydrate can then be prepared via addition of diethylether as an antisolvent.

== Scott's test ==
Scott's Test or Scott Test refers to a rapid and low-cost method of preliminary testing for cocaine. It is a mixture of an acid medium and 2% cobalt(II) thiocyanate. While typically used for cocaine, it will also indicate the presence of ketamine hydrochlorides, heroin, and dibucaine in amounts higher than 1 mg, as well as diltiazem and lidocaine in amounts higher than or equal to 5 mg. When the cobalt thiocyanate reagent interacts with cocaine hydrochloride, the solution turns from a reddish-brown to a vibrant blue.

The test has been responsible for widespread false positives and false convictions.

== Cobalt thiocyanate test ==
Detailed procedures for the cobalt thiocyanate test, often sold as the "morris reagent" are available. The reagent consists of 2% cobalt thiocyanate dissolved in dilute acid. Glycerol is added when using the reagent for Thin-layer chromatography as it stabilises the cobalt complex, ensuring it only goes blue when in contact with an analyte and not due to drying on the plate.

Addition of the cobalt thiocyanate reagent to cocaine hydrochloride results in the surface of the particles turning a bright blue (faint blue for cocaine base). The solution changes back to pink upon adding some hydrochloric acid. Addition of chloroform, results in a blue organic layer for both cocaine hydrochloride and cocaine base. Diphenhydramine and lidocaine also give blue organic layers. These compounds are known false positives for cocaine. Lidocaine is commonly used to adulterate or mimic cocaine due to its local anaesthetic effect.

If the procedure is adjusted to basify the sample with 0.1 N sodium hydroxide rather than acidifying it, the test can be used to test for ketamine hydrochloride.
