= Linnemann =

Linnemann is a German surname. Notable people with the surname include:

- Carsten Linnemann (born 1977), German politician
- Eduard Linnemann (1841–1886), German chemist
- Eta Linnemann (1926–2009), German theologian
- Felix Linnemann (1882–1948), German executive
- James T. Linnemann, American physicist

== See also ==
- Linneman
