= C7H6N2S =

The molecular formula C_{7}H_{6}N_{2}S (molar mass: 150.20 g/mol) may refer to:

- 2-Aminobenzothiazole
- Mercaptobenzimidazole
- Benzothiadiazine
