= Cobalt(II) cyanate =

Identifiers
CAS Number	38150-63-9
3D model (JSmol)	Interactive image; isocyanate: Interactive image
PubChem CID	isocyanate: 15345298
- InChI: isocyanate: InChI=1S/2CNO.Co/c2*2-1-3;/q2*-1;+2 Key: JXDJYNWFLIUUIU-UHFFFAOYSA-N
- SMILES: C(#N)[O-].C(#N)[O-].[Co+2]; isocyanate: C(=[N-])=O.C(=[N-])=O.[Co+2]

Properties
Chemical formula	Co(OCN)_{2}
Molar mass	142.97 g/mol

Related compounds
Other anions	Cobalt(II) thiocyanate
- Except where otherwise noted, data are given for materials in their standard state (at 25 °C [77 °F], 100 kPa). Infobox references

Cobalt(II) cyanate is the hypothetical inorganic compound with the formula Co(OCN)_{2}.

The simple cobalt(II) cyanate has not been proven to be made. However, the tetraisocyanatocobalt(II) ion (Co(NCO)_{4}^{2-}) is known and its blue color and is used as a qualitative test for cobalt(II) ions.

== History ==
Cobalt(II) cyanate was claimed to have been produced in 1952 by carefully heating pyridine cobalt(II) cyanate under vacuum. The nature of the compound produced has not been elucidated by X-ray diffraction.

In contrast, the tetraisocyanatocobalt(II) ion (Co(NCO)_{4}^{2-}) has been identified by X-ray crystallography and is widely known. After being first produced in 1871, it has been used as a qualitative test for cobalt(II).

Other cyanate complexes of cobalt have been discovered, such as tetrakis(pyridine)cobalt(II) cyanate.

== Complexes ==
=== Tetracyanatocobaltate(II) ===
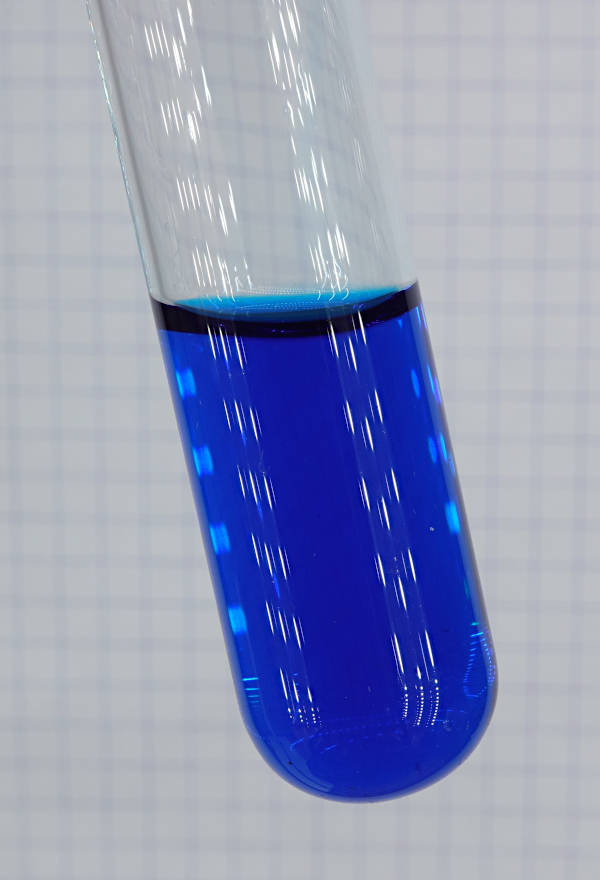
A solution of tetracyanatocobaltate(II)

Multiple compounds of the related tetracyanatocobaltate(II) has been structurally elucidated, such as [Co(C_{5}H_{5})_{2}]_{2}[Co(NCO)_{4}]. All of these complexes have an intense blue color.

Potassium tetraisocyanatocobaltate(II) has been produced by the reaction of potassium cyanate and cobalt(II) nitrate:

4 KOCN + Co(NO_{3})_{2} → K_{2}[Co(NCO)_{4}] + 2 KNO_{3}

Tetracyanatocobaltate(II) salts with other counterions, such as cobaltcenium [Co(C_{5}H_{5})]^{+} and EMIM are known.

=== Other adducts ===
Cobalt(II) cyanate complexes have been produced by the addition of potassium cyanate to a soluble cobalt salt, such as cobalt(II) chloride, followed by the addition of the complexing agent, such as pyridine, bipyridine, quinoline, and 2,6-dimethylpyrazine.

== Structure ==
Although the simple cyanate is unknown, the structure of the tetracyanatocobaltate(II) ion has been elucidated. The [Co(NCO)_{4}]^{2-} ion consists of a nitrogen-bonded tetrahedral central cobalt atom. The cobalt-nitrogen bond length is about 1.96 Å.
