= Ammonium thiocyanate =

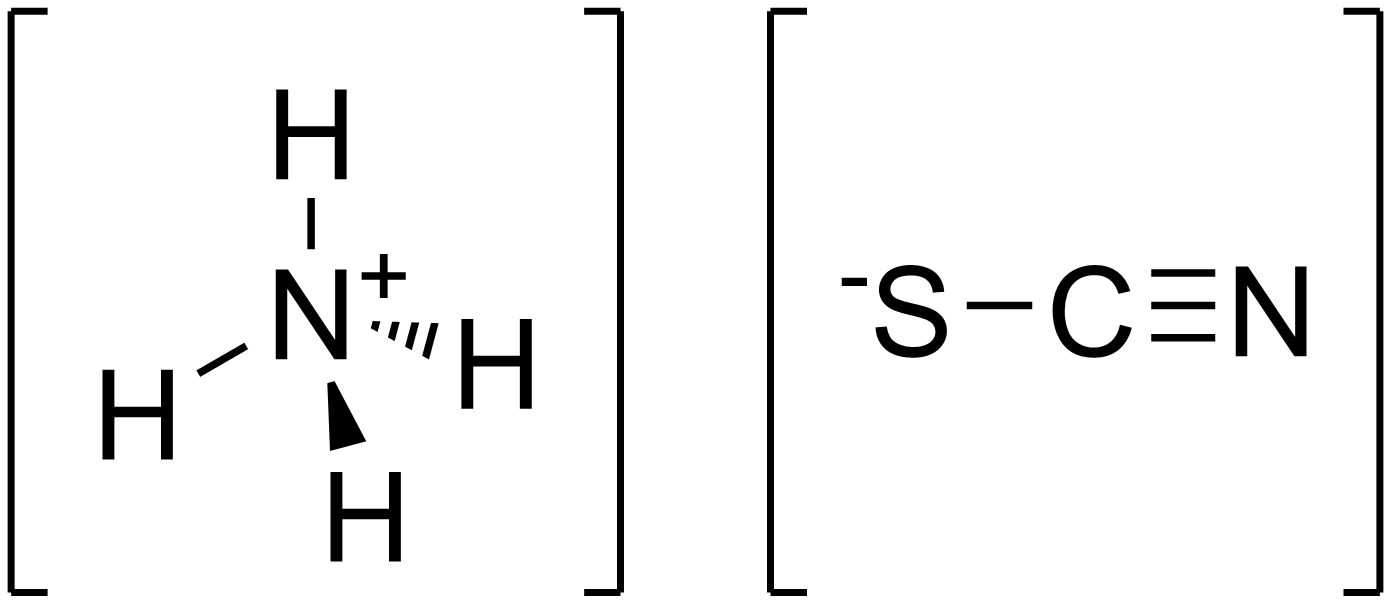

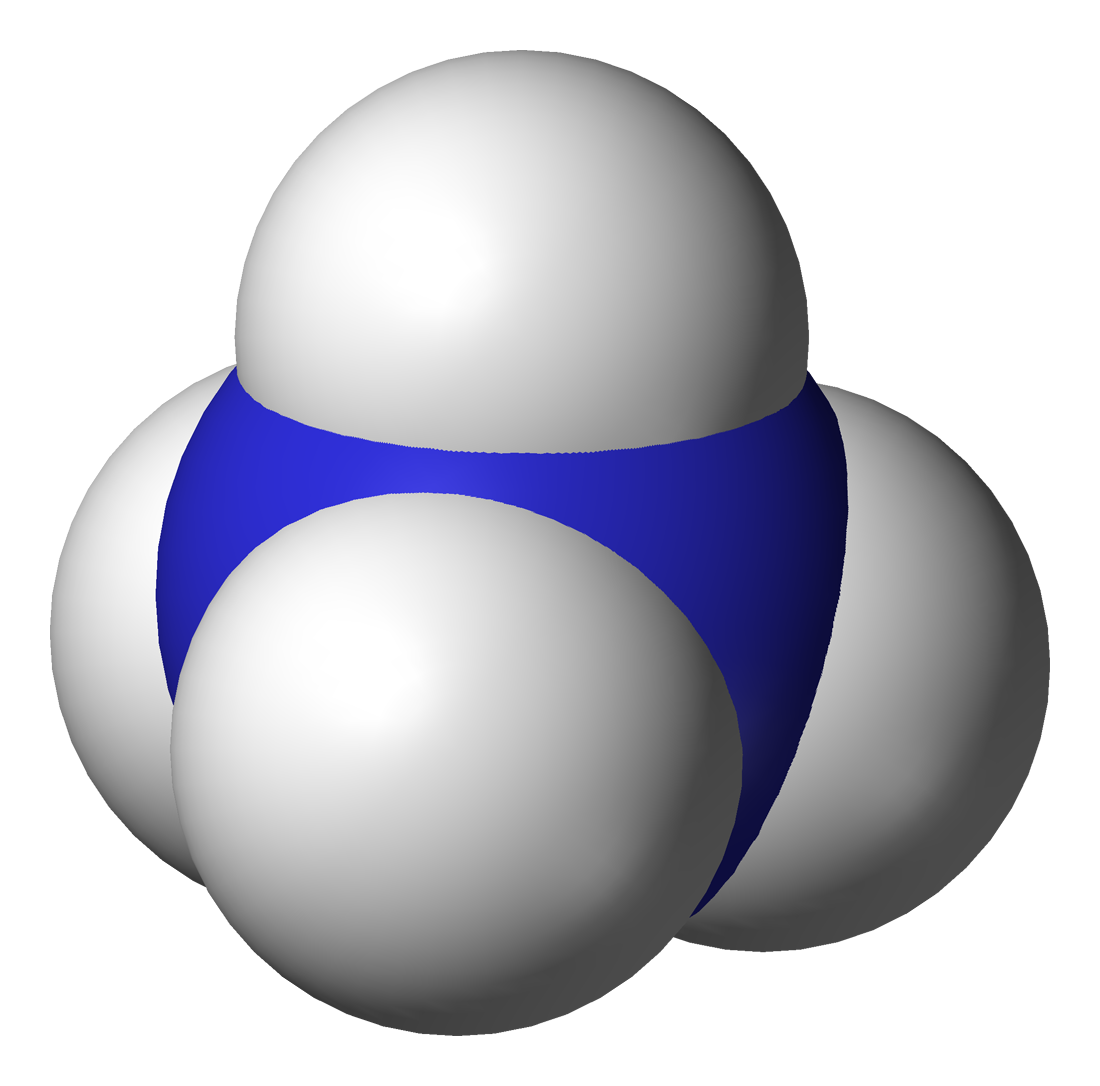
Space-filling model of the ammonium cation
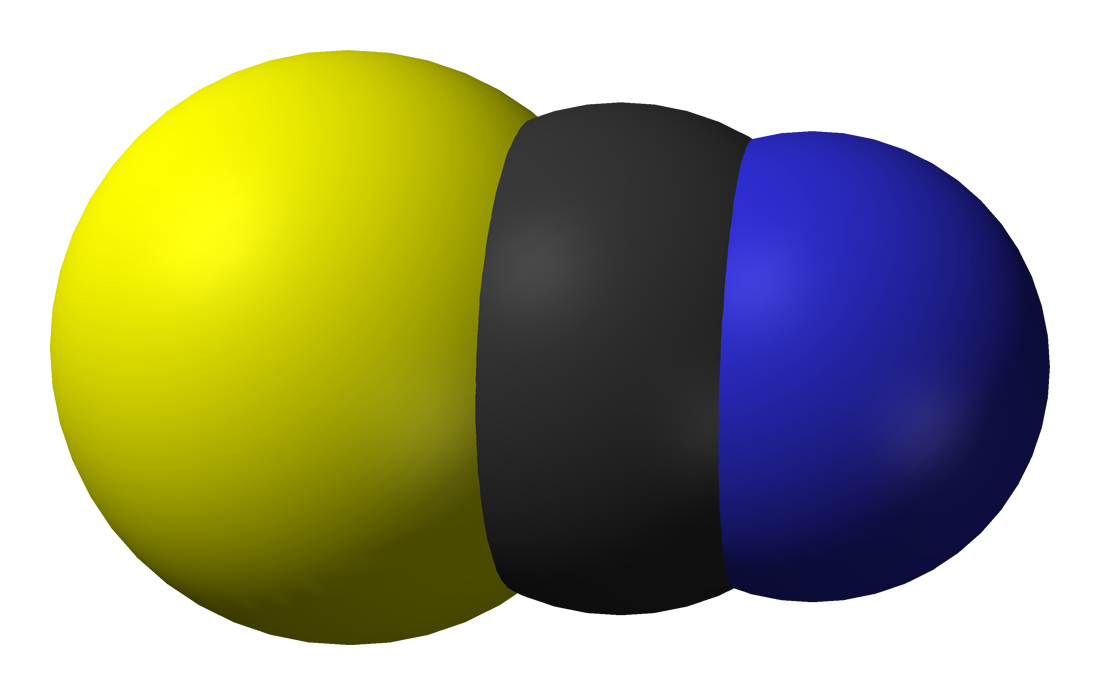
Space-filling model of the thiocyanate anion

Identifiers
CAS Number	1762-95-4
3D model (JSmol)	Interactive image
ChEBI	CHEBI:231858
ChemSpider	14901
ECHA InfoCard	100.015.614
EC Number	217-175-6
PubChem CID	15666
RTECS number	XN6465000
UNII	YYL9152Z1Y
UN number	3077
CompTox Dashboard (EPA)	DTXSID3029653
- InChI: InChI=1S/CHNS.H3N/c2-1-3;/h3H;1H3 Key: SOIFLUNRINLCBN-UHFFFAOYSA-N; InChI=1/CHNS.H3N/c2-1-3;/h3H;1H3 Key: SOIFLUNRINLCBN-UHFFFAOYAF
- SMILES: [S-]C#N.[NH4+]

Properties
Chemical formula	[NH_{4}][SCN]
Molar mass	76.122 g/mol
Appearance	Colorless hygroscopic crystalline solid
Density	1.305 g/cm^{3}
Melting point	149.5 °C (301.1 °F; 422.6 K)
Boiling point	170 °C (338 °F; 443 K) (decomposes)
Solubility in water	128 g/(100 mL) (0 °C)
Solubility	soluble in liquid ammonia, alcohol, acetone
Magnetic susceptibility (χ)	−48.1·10^{−6} cm^{3}/mol

Hazards
- GHS labelling
Pictograms	(GHS07: Exclamation mark) (GHS09: Environmental hazard)
Signal word	Warning
Hazard statements	H302, H312, H332, H410, H412
Precautionary statements	P261, P264, P270, P271, P273, P280, P301+P312, P302+P352, P304+P312, P304+P340, P312, P322, P330, P363, P391, P501
NFPA 704 (fire diamond)	2 1 1
Safety data sheet (SDS)	External MSDS

Related compounds
Other anions	Ammonium cyanate
Other cations	Guanidinium thiocyanate; Lithium thiocyanate; Sodium thiocyanate; Potassium thiocyanate; Barium thiocyanate; Cobalt(II) thiocyanate; Copper(I) thiocyanate; Copper(II) thiocyanate; Silver thiocyanate; Mercury(II) thiocyanate; Lead(II) thiocyanate
Related compounds	Ammonium cyanide
- Except where otherwise noted, data are given for materials in their standard state (at 25 °C [77 °F], 100 kPa). verify (what is ?) Infobox references

Ammonium thiocyanate is an inorganic compound with the formula [NH_{4}]^{+}[SCN]^{−}. It is an ammonium salt of thiocyanic acid. It consists of ammonium cations [NH_{4}]^{+} and thiocyanate anions [SCN]^{−}.

== Uses ==
Ammonium thiocyanate is used in the manufacture of herbicides, thiourea, and transparent artificial resins; in matches; as a stabilizing agent in photography; in various rustproofing compositions; as an adjuvant in textile dyeing and printing; as a tracer in oil fields; in the separation of hafnium from zirconium (important for the production of hafnium-free zircalloy for use in nuclear fuel cladding), and in titrimetric analyses.

In May 1945, USAAF General Victor E. Betrandias advanced a proposal to his superior General Arnold to use of ammonium thiocyanate to reduce rice crops in Japan as part of the bombing raids on their country.

Ammonium thiocyanate can also be used to determine the iron content in soft drinks by colorimetry.

Ammonium thiocyanate may also be used to separate quinidine, from liquors, after the isolation of quinine from the neutral, aqueous, sulphate solution. The salt is added to the hot solution and the gummy solid that forms is strained off from the liquid. The solid is then refluxed with methanol, which dissolves most of the impurities, leaving the quinidine thiocyanate as a crystalline solid of 90 - 95% purity. Following separation, (usually by centrifuge) the solid may then be further purified to pharmaceutical quality. (Quinidine is used for the treatment of heart arrhythmia and therefore has considerable value.)

== Preparation ==
Ammonium thiocyanate is made by the reaction of carbon disulfide with aqueous ammonia. Ammonium dithiocarbamate is formed as an intermediate in this reaction, which upon heating, decomposes to ammonium thiocyanate and hydrogen sulfide:

CS_{2} + 2 NH_{3}(aq) → [NH_{2}−CS_{2}]^{−}[NH_{4}]^{+} → [NH_{4}]^{+}[SCN]^{−} + H_{2}S

== Reactions ==
Ammonium thiocyanate is stable in air; however, upon heating it isomerizes to thiourea:

The equilibrium mixtures at 150 °C and 180 °C contain 30.3% and 25.3% (by weight) thiourea, respectively. When heated at 200 °C, the dry powder decomposes to ammonia, hydrogen sulfide, and carbon disulfide, leaving a residue of guanidinium thiocyanate.

[NH_{4}]^{+}[SCN]^{−} is weakly acidic due to the ammonium ion; it reacts with alkali hydroxides, such as sodium hydroxide or potassium hydroxide to form sodium thiocyanate or potassium thiocyanate, along with water and ammonia. The thiocyanate anion, specifically, reacts with ferric salts to form a deep-red ferric thiocyanate derivative (of unknown structure).
