= Benzothiazole =

Chemical compound

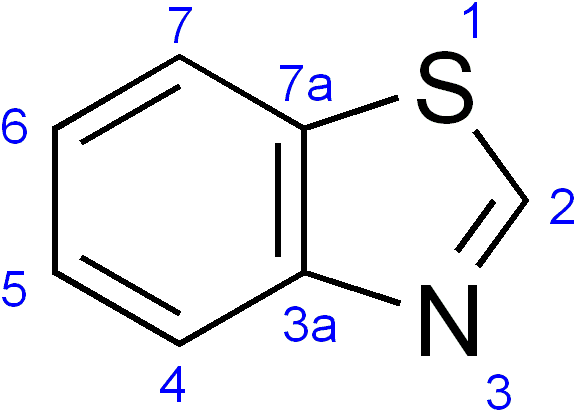

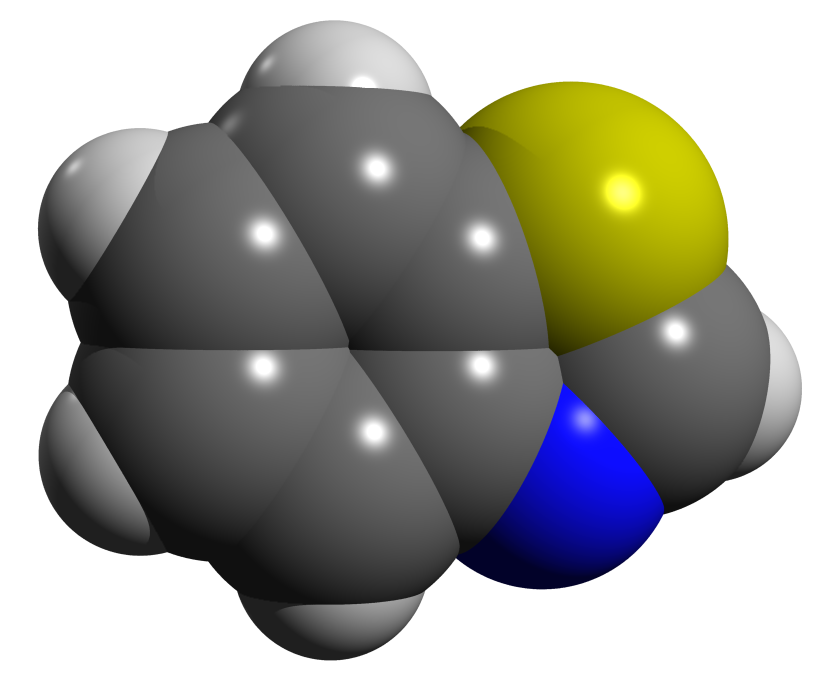
Space filling model of benzothiazole
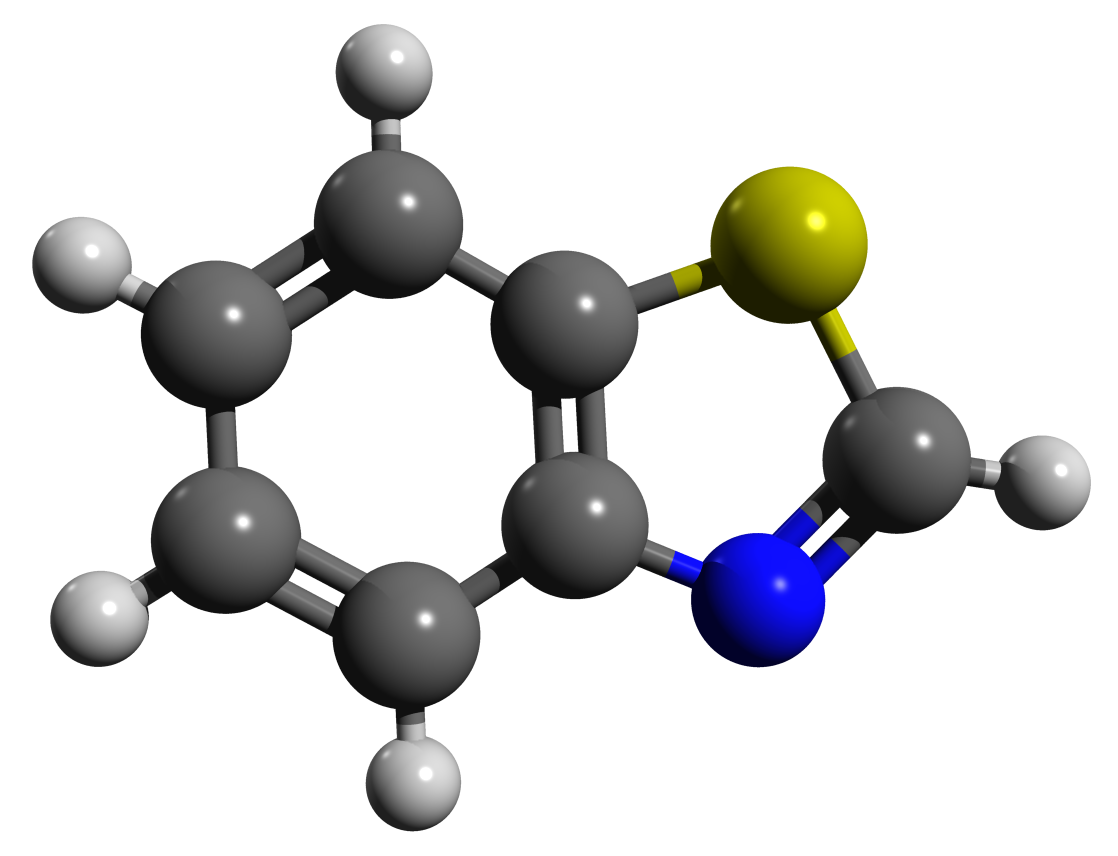
Ball-and-stick model of benzothiazole

Names
- Preferred IUPAC name 1,3-Benzothiazole

Identifiers
CAS Number	95-16-9
3D model (JSmol)	Interactive image
ChEBI	CHEBI:45993
ChEMBL	ChEMBL510309
ChemSpider	6952
ECHA InfoCard	100.002.179
PubChem CID	7222
UNII	G5BW2593EP
CompTox Dashboard (EPA)	DTXSID7024586
- InChI: InChI=1S/C7H5NS/c1-2-4-7-6(3-1)8-5-9-7/h1-5H Key: IOJUPLGTWVMSFF-UHFFFAOYSA-N; InChI=1/C7H5NS/c1-2-4-7-6(3-1)8-5-9-7/h1-5H Key: IOJUPLGTWVMSFF-UHFFFAOYAC
- SMILES: n1c2ccccc2sc1

Properties
Chemical formula	C_{7}H_{5}NS
Molar mass	135.1863 g/mol
Appearance	colorless liquid
Density	1.238 g/mL
Melting point	2 °C (36 °F; 275 K)
Boiling point	227 to 228 °C (441 to 442 °F; 500 to 501 K)
- Except where otherwise noted, data are given for materials in their standard state (at 25 °C [77 °F], 100 kPa). Infobox references

Benzothiazole, or more specifically 1,3-benzothiazole, is an aromatic heterocyclic compound with the chemical formula C_{7}H_{5}NS. It is colorless, slightly viscous liquid. Although the parent compound, benzothiazole is not widely used, many of its derivatives are found in commercial products or in nature. Firefly luciferin is a derivative of benzothiazole. It has a sulfurous odor and meaty flavor.

The three structural isomers of benzothizaole are 1,3-benzothiazole, 1,2-benzothiazole and 2,1-benzothiazole.

== Structure and reactivity ==
Benzothiazoles consist of a 5-membered 1,3-thiazole ring fused to a benzene ring. The nine atoms of the bicycle and the attached substituents are coplanar. The heterocyclic core of the molecule is readily substituted at the methyne (CH) centre in the thiazole ring. Thiazole is electron-withdrawing.

== Synthesis and biosynthesis ==
Benzothiazoles are typically prepared by treatment of 2-mercaptoaniline. For example, acid chlorides are effective:

C_{6}H_{4}(NH_{2})SH + RC(O)Cl → C_{6}H_{4}(N)SCR + HCl + H_{2}O

Many other precursors have been used, commonly aldehydes in the presence of oxidants. In some cases, benzothiazoles are prepared directly from anilines, a process that entails ortho functionalization.

Naturally occurring benzothiazoles are proposed to arise by condensation of cysteine with quinones.

== Uses ==
=== Dyes ===
The dye thioflavin is a benzothiazole derivative.

=== Food additives ===
Benzothiazole occurs naturally in some foods but is also used as a food additive. It has a sulfurous odor and meaty flavor. The European Food Safety Authority assessment had "no safety concern at estimated levels of intake as a flavouring substance".

=== Rubber additive ===
Accelerators for the sulfur vulcanization of rubber are based on 2-mercaptobenzothiazoles.

=== Pharmacology ===
Ziprasidone is used to treat schizophrenia and bipolar disorder.

Benzothiazoles have been widely investigated for their bioactivity. The benzothiazole moiety is, for example, seen in certain dopamine-acting drugs, e.g. riluzole and pramipexole. Moreover, benzothiazole derivatives act as monoamine oxidase inhibitors or dopamine antagonists:

- 6-oxoethers and derivatives of thiadiazole, thiazolyhydrazine that act selectively on either MAO-A or MAO-B depending on the O-sidechain
- 1-alkylpiperidines that act on dopamine D_{4} receptor

== See also ==
- thiazoles, which lack the fused benzene ring.
- Benzoxazoles, which substitute an oxygen for the sulfur atom.
- 2-Aminobenzothiazoles, well-studied derivatives of benzothiazole

== Safety and environmental considerations ==
Benzothiazoles are widely used in the vulcanization of rubber, so their possible role in the environment has attracted attention. Evidence suggests that they biodegrade readily.
