= Barium thiocyanate =

Water-soluble salt

Names
- IUPAC name Barium thiocyanate
- Other names: Barium sulfur cyanide; Barium(II) thiocyanate; Barium sulfocyanide

Identifiers
CAS Number	2092-17-3; trihydrate: 68016-36-4
3D model (JSmol)	Interactive image
ChemSpider	144591
ECHA InfoCard	100.016.587
EC Number	218-245-9
PubChem CID	164928
UNII	3412AZ8I1A
CompTox Dashboard (EPA)	DTXSID90890553
- InChI: InChI=1S/2CHNS.Ba/c2*2-1-3;/h2*3H;/q;;+2/p-2 Key: LKZCRGABYQYUFX-UHFFFAOYSA-L
- SMILES: C(#N)[S-].C(#N)[S-].[Ba+2]

Properties
Chemical formula	Ba(SCN)_{2}
Molar mass	253.49 g/mol
Appearance	White crystals
Solubility in water	62.63 g/100 ml (25°C)
Solubility	Soluble in acetone, methanol, and ethanol

Hazards
- GHS labelling
Pictograms	(GHS07: Exclamation mark)
Hazard statements	H301, H312, H315, H319, H332, H335
Precautionary statements	P261, P280, P302+P352, P304+P340
- Except where otherwise noted, data are given for materials in their standard state (at 25 °C [77 °F], 100 kPa). Infobox references

Barium thiocyanate refers to salts of the formula Ba(SCN)_{2.}xH_{2}O. Both an anhydrous salt and a trihydrate are known. The anhydrous salt is hygroscopic. The trihydrate is soluble in most alcohols but insoluble in simple alkanes. Barium thiocyanate is used in dyeing textiles and in some photographic solutions; however, due to its toxicity, it has limited uses.

== Preparation and structure ==
Barium thiocyanate is prepared by mixing barium hydroxide and ammonium thiocyanate in water.

2 NH_{4}SCN + Ba(OH)_{2} → Ba(SCN)_{2} + 2 NH_{3} + 2 H_{2}O

According to X-ray crystallography, the anhydrous salt is a coordination polymer. The Ba^{2+} ions are each bonded to eight thiocyanate anions, with four Ba-S and four Ba-N bonds. The motif is reminiscent of the fluorite structure. Strontium thiocyanate, calcium thiocyanate, and lead thiocyanate adopt the same structure.
