= Silver thiocyanate =

- Skeletal formula of silver thiocyanate

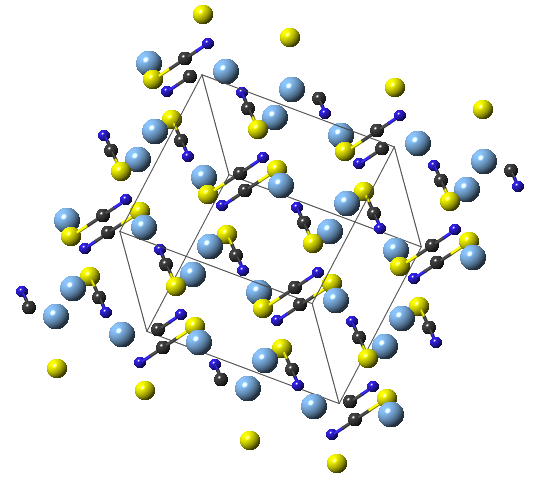
- Ball-and-stick model of silver thiocyanate

Names
- IUPAC name Silver(I) thiocyanate, Silver thiocyanate
- Other names Thiocyanic acid, silver (1+) thiocyanate; Silver isothiocyanate; Silver sulphocyanide

Identifiers
CAS Number	1701-93-5
3D model (JSmol)	Interactive image
ChemSpider	66941
ECHA InfoCard	100.015.395
EC Number	216-934-9
PubChem CID	74345
UNII	S44O8TME5U
UN number	3077
CompTox Dashboard (EPA)	DTXSID30883742
- InChI: InChI=1S/CHNS.Ag/c2-1-3;/h3H;/q;+1/p-1 Key: RHUVFRWZKMEWNS-UHFFFAOYSA-M
- SMILES: C(#N)[S-].[Ag+]

Properties
Chemical formula	AgSCN
Molar mass	165.95 g/mol
Appearance	Colorless crystals
Odor	Odorless
Melting point	170 °C (338 °F; 443 K) decomposes
Solubility in water	0.14 mg/L (19.96 °C); 0.25 mg/L (21 °C); 6.68 mg/L (100 °C)
Solubility product (K_{sp})	1.03·10^{−12}
Solubility	Insoluble in acids (reacts) except when concentrated, acetates, aq. nitrates
Solubility in silver nitrate	43.2 mg/L (25.2 °C, 3 n_{AgNO_{3}/H_{2}O})
Solubility in sulfur dioxide	14 mg/kg (0 °C)
Solubility in methanol	0.0022 mg/kg
Magnetic susceptibility (χ)	−6.18·10^{−5} cm^{3}/mol

Structure
Crystal structure	Monoclinic, mS32 (293 K)
Space group	C2/c, No. 15 (293 K)
Point group	2/m (293 K)
Lattice constant	a = 8.792(5) Å, b = 7.998(5) Å, c = 8.207(5) Å (293 K) α = 90°, β = 93.75(1)°, γ = 90°
Formula units (Z)	8

Thermochemistry
Heat capacity (C)	63 J/mol·K
Std molar entropy (S^{⦵}_{298})	131 J/mol·K
Std enthalpy of formation (Δ_{f}H^{⦵}_{298})	88 kJ/mol

Hazards
- GHS labelling
Pictograms	(GHS07: Exclamation mark) (GHS09: Environmental hazard)
Signal word	Warning
Hazard statements	H302, H312, H332, H410
Precautionary statements	P273, P280, P501
NFPA 704 (fire diamond)	2 0 0
- Except where otherwise noted, data are given for materials in their standard state (at 25 °C [77 °F], 100 kPa). Infobox references

Silver thiocyanate is the silver salt of thiocyanic acid with the formula AgSCN. Silver thiocyanate appears as a white crystalline powder. It is very commonly used in the synthesis of silver nanoparticles. Additionally, studies have found silver nanoparticles to be present in saliva present during the entire digestive process of silver nitrate. Silver thiocyanate is slightly soluble in water, with a solubility of 1.68 × 10^{−4} g/L. It is insoluble in ethanol, acetone, and acid.

== Structure ==
AgSCN is monoclinic with 8 molecules per unit cell. Each SCN^{−} group has an almost linear molecular geometry, with bond angle 179.6(5)°. Weak Ag—Ag interactions of length 0.3249(2) nm to 0.3338(2) nm are present in the structure.

== Production ==
=== Solution reaction ===
Silver thiocyanate has been commonly produced by the reaction between silver nitrate and potassium thiocyanate.

AgNO_{3} + KSCN → KNO_{3} + AgSCN

=== Ion-exchange route ===
Silver thiocyanate may be formed via an ion exchange reaction. In this double displacement reaction, silver nitrate and ammonium thiocyanate are dissolved in distilled water to produce silver thiocyanate and ammonium nitrate.

AgNO_{3} + NH_{4}SCN → NH_{4}NO_{3} + AgSCN

Additionally, silver thiocyanate can be formed through the double displacement reaction between ammonium thiocyanate and silver chloride to form a precipitate of silver thiocyanate.

AgCl + NH_{4}SCN → NH_{4}Cl + AgSCN

== Uses ==
The most common use of silver thiocyanate is as a silver nanoparticle. Silver thiocyanate nanoparticles have been found in saliva throughout the entire artificial digestion of silver nitrate. The nanoparticles can also be used as good ion conductors.

Silver thiocyanate has also been used to absorb uv-visible light at values less than 500 nm. At longer wavelengths, silver thiocyanate has been found to have good photocatalytic properties.

== Characterization ==
Upon production, silver thiocyanate can be characterized through a wide range of techniques: x-ray powder diffraction (XRD), x-ray photoelectron spectroscopy (XPS), Raman Spectroscopy, ultraviolet photoelectron spectroscopy (UPS), and thermogravimetric analysis (TGA).
