= Thiocyanate hydrolase =

thiocyanate hydrolase

Identifiers
- EC no.: 3.5.5.8

Databases
- IntEnz: IntEnz view
- BRENDA: BRENDA entry
- ExPASy: NiceZyme view
- KEGG: KEGG entry
- MetaCyc: metabolic pathway
- PRIAM: profile
- PDB structures: RCSB PDB PDBe PDBsum
- Gene Ontology: AmiGO / QuickGO
Search
- PMC: articles
- PubMed: articles
- NCBI: proteins

A thiocyanate hydrolase (EC 3.5.5.8) is an enzyme belonging to the family of hydrolases. The systematic name of this enzyme class is thiocyanate aminohydrolase. This enzyme catalyzes the chemical reaction:

SCN^{−} + 2 H_{2}O + H^{+} ⇌ SCO + NH_{3}

The mechanism is proposed to involve a metal thiocyanate complex.

== Structural studies ==
As of late 2007, 4 structures have been solved for this class of enzymes, with PDB accession codes 2DD4, 2DD5, 2DXB, and 2DXC.

A second thiocyanate hydrolase with copper at its active site catalyzes its conversion to cyanate:

SCN^{−} + H_{2}O → OCN^{−} + H_{2}S
