= Sodium thiocyanate =

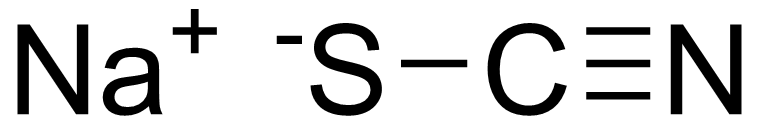

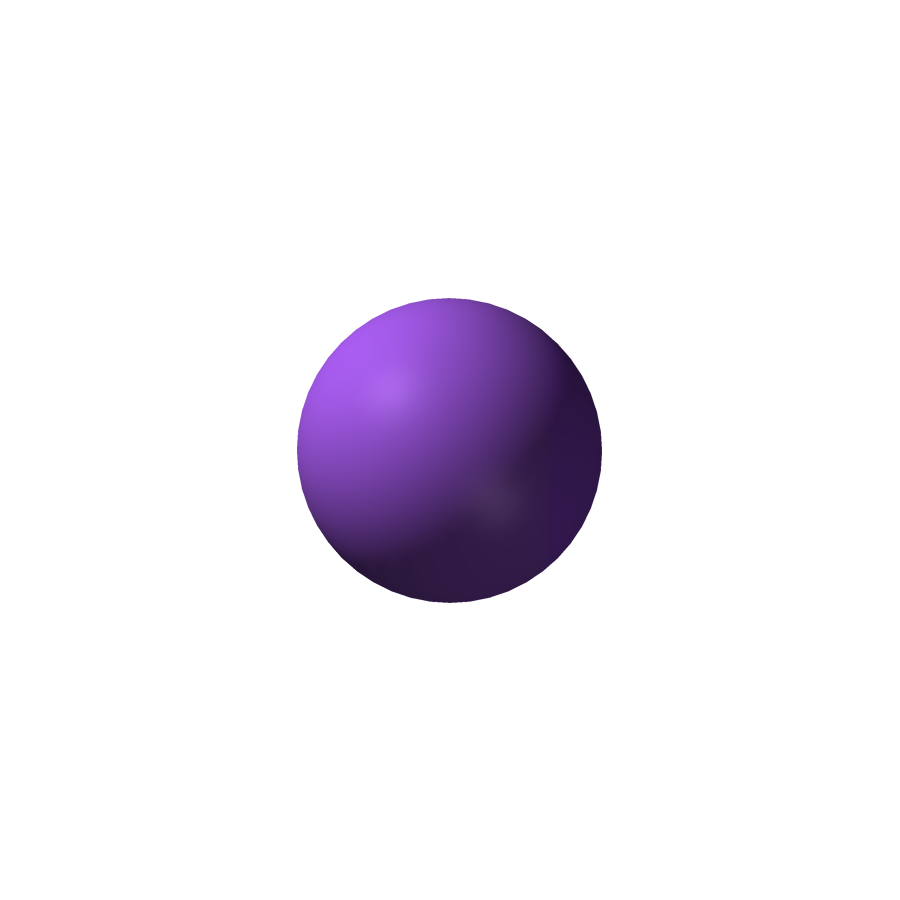
The sodium cation
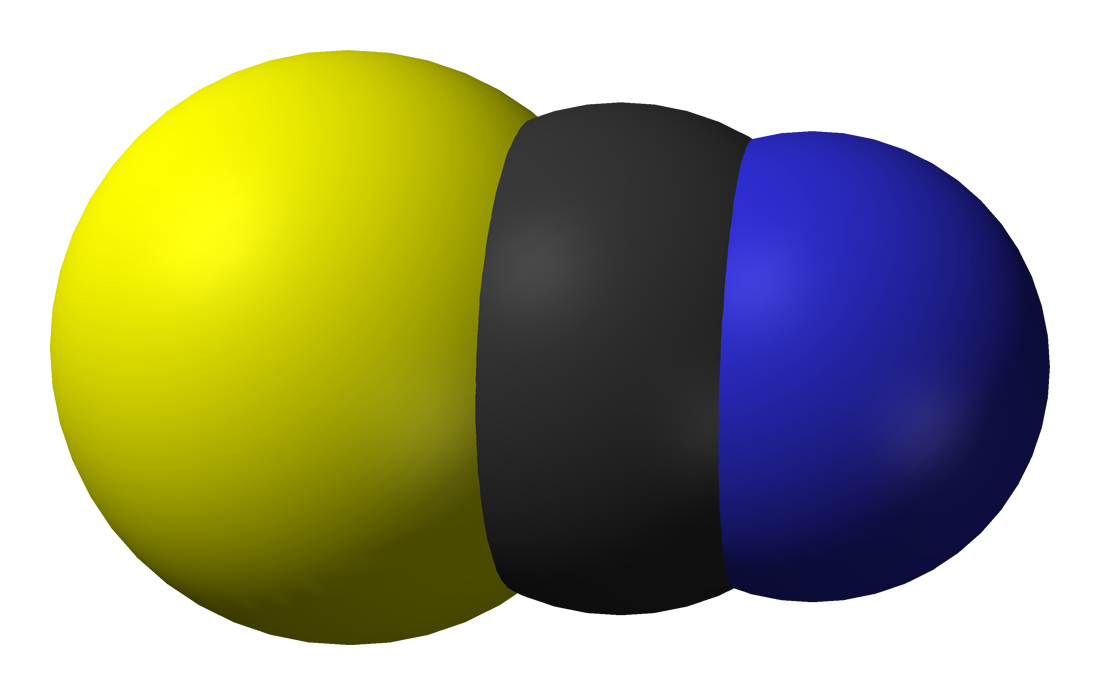
The thiocyanate anion (space-filling model)
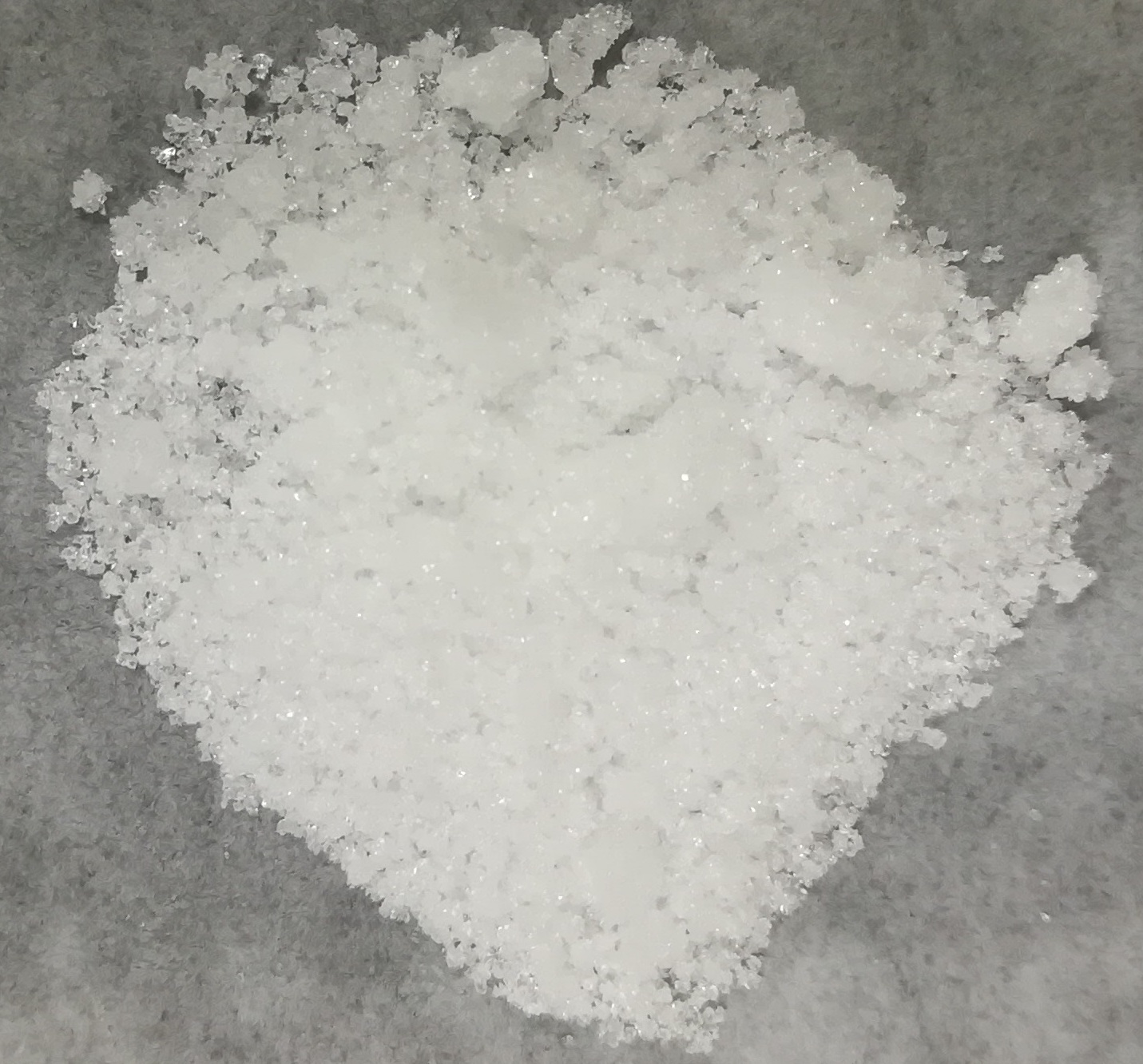

Names
- IUPAC name Sodium thiocyanate
- Other names Sodium rhodanide Sodium sulfocyanate Sodium rhodanate Thiocyanic acid, sodium salt

Identifiers
CAS Number	540-72-7
3D model (JSmol)	Interactive image
Beilstein Reference	3594965
ChEBI	CHEBI:30952
ChEMBL	ChEMBL1644028; ChEMBL84336; ChEMBL1078613
ChemSpider	10443
ECHA InfoCard	100.007.960
EC Number	208-754-4
Gmelin Reference	1249825
PubChem CID	516871
RTECS number	XL2275000
UNII	5W0K9HKA05
CompTox Dashboard (EPA)	DTXSID4021343
- InChI: InChI=1S/CHNS.Na/c2-1-3;/h3H;/q;+1/p-1 Key: VGTPCRGMBIAPIM-UHFFFAOYSA-M; InChI=1S/CHNS.Na/c2-1-3;/h3H;/q;+1/p-1 Key: VGTPCRGMBIAPIM-REWHXWOFAB; Key: VGTPCRGMBIAPIM-UHFFFAOYSA-M
- SMILES: [Na+].[S-]C#N

Properties
Chemical formula	NaSCN
Molar mass	81.072 g/mol
Appearance	deliquescent colorless crystals
Density	1.735 g/cm^{3}
Melting point	287 °C (549 °F; 560 K)
Boiling point	307 °C (585 °F; 580 K) decomposes
Solubility in water	139 g/100 mL (21 °C); 225 g/100 mL (100 °C)
Solubility	soluble in acetone, alcohols, ammonia, SO_{2}
Acidity (pK_{a})	−1.28
Refractive index (n_{D})	1.545

Structure
Crystal structure	orthorhombic

Hazards
- GHS labelling
Pictograms	(GHS05: Corrosive) (GHS07: Exclamation mark)
Signal word	Danger
Hazard statements	H302, H312, H332, H412
Precautionary statements	P261, P264, P270, P271, P273, P280, P301+P312, P302+P352, P304+P312, P304+P340, P305+P351+P338, P310, P312, P322, P330, P337+P313, P363, P501
NFPA 704 (fire diamond)	2 0 0
- Lethal dose or concentration (LD, LC)
LD_{50} (median dose)	764 mg/kg (oral, rat)
Safety data sheet (SDS)	ICSC 0675

Related compounds
Other anions	Sodium cyanate Sodium cyanide
Other cations	Lithium thiocyanate Potassium thiocyanate Ammonium thiocyanate
- Except where otherwise noted, data are given for materials in their standard state (at 25 °C [77 °F], 100 kPa). verify (what is ?) Infobox references

Sodium thiocyanate (sometimes called sodium sulphocyanide) is the chemical compound with the formula NaSCN. This colorless deliquescent salt is one of the main sources of the thiocyanate anion. As such, it is used as a precursor for the synthesis of pharmaceuticals and other specialty chemicals. Thiocyanate salts are typically prepared by the reaction of cyanide with elemental sulfur:

8 NaCN + S_{8} → 8 NaSCN

Sodium thiocyanate crystallizes in an orthorhombic cell. Each Na^{+} center is surrounded by three sulfur and three nitrogen ligands provided by the triatomic thiocyanate anion. It is commonly used in the laboratory as a test for the presence of Fe^{3+} ions.

== Applications in chemical synthesis ==
Sodium thiocyanate is employed to convert alkyl halides into the corresponding alkylthiocyanates. Treatment of isopropyl bromide with sodium thiocyanate in a hot ethanolic solution affords isopropyl thiocyanate. Protonation of sodium thiocyanate affords isothiocyanic acid, S=C=NH (pK_{a} = −1.28). Isothiocyanic acid, typically generated in situ from sodium thiocyanate, adds to anilines to afford 2-aminobenzothiazoles.

== Related compounds ==
Closely related reagents include ammonium thiocyanate and potassium thiocyanate, which has twice the solubility in water. Silver thiocyanate may be used as well; the precipitation of insoluble silver halides help simplify workup.
