= Linneman =

Linneman is a surname. Notable people with the surname include:

- Moos Linneman (1931–2020), Dutch boxer
- Peter Linneman (born 1951), American businessman

== See also ==
- Linneman Building, a historic building in Lima, Ohio, United States
- Linnemann
