= James T. Linnemann =

American physicist

James T. Linnemann is an American physicist.

From Michigan State University, Linnemann was awarded the status of Fellow in the American Physical Society, after he was nominated by the Division of Particles and Fields in 2009, for original research in high energy physics and particle astrophysics through electronics and software applications, seminal contributions to the discoveries of the top quark and TeV gamma-ray sources, searches for supersymmetry, and applications of statistics.

== See also ==
- List of fellows of the American Physical Society (1998–2010)
