= 2-Aminobenzothiazole =

Names
- Preferred IUPAC name 1,3-Benzothiazol-2-amine
- Other names 2-aminobenzthiazole

Identifiers
CAS Number	136-95-8
3D model (JSmol)	Interactive image
ChEBI	CHEBI:167751
ChEMBL	ChEMBL329785
ChemSpider	8382
ECHA InfoCard	100.004.790
EC Number	205-268-4
PubChem CID	8706
UNII	08K5TLY3EQ
UN number	2811 (2-AMINOBENZOTHIAZOLE)
CompTox Dashboard (EPA)	DTXSID1024467
- InChI: InChI=1S/C7H6N2S/c8-7-9-5-3-1-2-4-6(5)10-7/h1-4H,(H2,8,9) Key: UHGULLIUJBCTEF-UHFFFAOYSA-N
- SMILES: C1=CC=C2C(=C1)N=C(S2)N

Properties
Chemical formula	C_{7}H_{6}N_{2}S
Molar mass	150.20 g·mol^{−1}
Density	1.753 g/cm^{3}
Melting point	126–129 °C (259–264 °F; 399–402 K)

Hazards
- GHS labelling
Pictograms	(GHS07: Exclamation mark) (GHS09: Environmental hazard)
Signal word	Warning
Hazard statements	H302, H319, H400
Precautionary statements	P264, P264+P265, P270, P273, P280, P301+P317, P305+P351+P338, P330, P337+P317, P391, P501
- Except where otherwise noted, data are given for materials in their standard state (at 25 °C [77 °F], 100 kPa). Infobox references

2-Aminobenzothiazole is the organic compound with the formula C_{6}H_{4}S(N)CNH_{2}. It is related to the parent benzothiazole, but with an amino group at the unique methyne position on the thiazole ring. As confirmed by X-ray crystallography, it is a planar molecule, which exists as the amine tautomer.

2-Aminobenzothiazoles are often prepared by cyclization of 2-bromo-substituted arylthioureas.

BrC_{6}H_{4}NHC(S)NH_{2} → C_{6}H_{4}SNCNH_{2} + HBr

Isothiocyanic acid, which can be generated in situ from sodium thiocyanate, adds to anilines to also afford 2-aminobenzothiazoles. Many other methods are available.

Diazotization of 2-aminobenzothiazoles gives diazonium salts. These salts undergo azo coupling with anilines. In this way some are prepared some useful dyes such as Basic Blue 54.
