= Calcium thiocyanate =

Water-soluble salt

- Ca^{2+} [N≡C−S^{−}]_{2}

Identifiers
| CAS Number | 2092-16-2 |
| 3D model (JSmol) | Interactive image |
| ChemSpider | 140363 |
| EC Number | 218-244-3 |
| PubChem CID | 159641 |
| UNII | P03NDO467X |
- InChI: InChI=1S/2CHNS.Ca/c2*2-1-3;/h2*3H;/q;;+2/p-2 Key: RLDQYSHDFVSAPL-UHFFFAOYSA-L
- SMILES: C(#N)[S-].C(#N)[S-].[Ca+2]

Properties
| Chemical formula | C_{2}CaN_{2}S_{2} |
| Molar mass | 156.23 g·mol^{−1} |
| Appearance | white solid |
- Except where otherwise noted, data are given for materials in their standard state (at 25 °C [77 °F], 100 kPa). Infobox references

Calcium thiocyanate refers to the salt Cs(SCN)_{2}. It is a colorless solid. According to X-ray crystallography, it is a coordination polymer. The Ca^{2+} ions are each bonded to eight thiocyanate anions, with four Ca-S and four Ca-N bonds. The motif is reminiscent of the fluorite structure.
