= Classes of metals =

Classification of Metals

Class A metals are metals that form hard acids. Hard acids are acids with relatively ionic bonds. These metals, such as iron, aluminium, titanium, sodium, calcium, and the lanthanides, would rather bond with fluorine than iodine. They form stable products with hard bases, which are bases with ionic bonds. They target molecules such as phospholipids, nucleic acids, and ATP.

Class B metals are metals that form soft acids. Soft acids are acids with relatively covalent bonds. These metals, such as lead, gold, palladium, platinum, mercury, and rhodium, would rather bond with iodine than fluorine. They form stable products with soft bases, which are bases with covalent bonds.

The IUPAC Gold Book provides a more general definition of a class (a) metal ion as "A metal ion that combines preferentially with ligands containing ligating atoms that are the lightest of their Periodic Group", and a class (b) metal ion as one "that combines preferentially with ligands containing ligating atoms other than the lightest of their Periodic Group."

== See also ==
- HSAB theory, hard and soft (Lewis) acids and bases
