= Potassium thiocyanate =

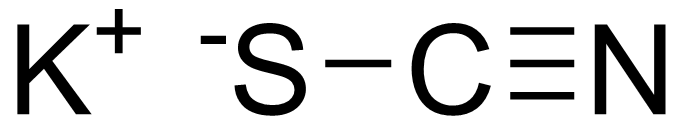

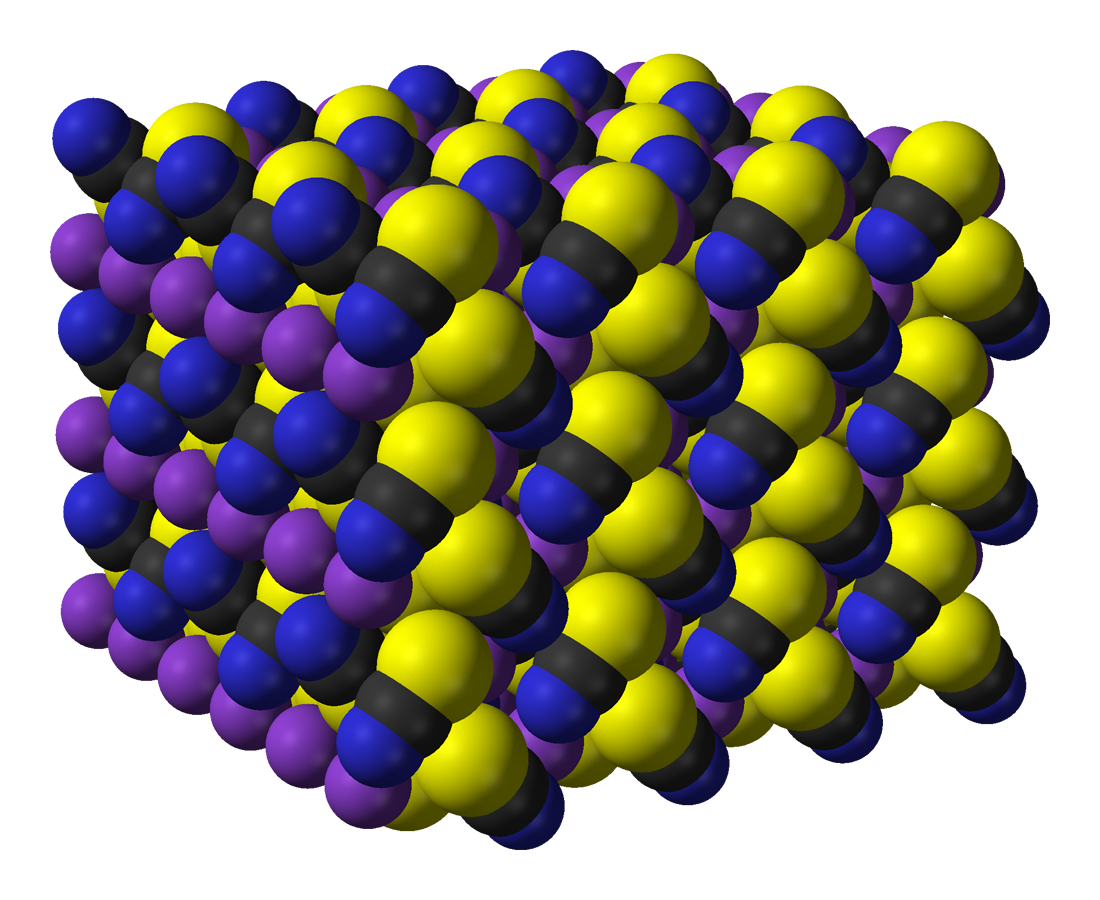

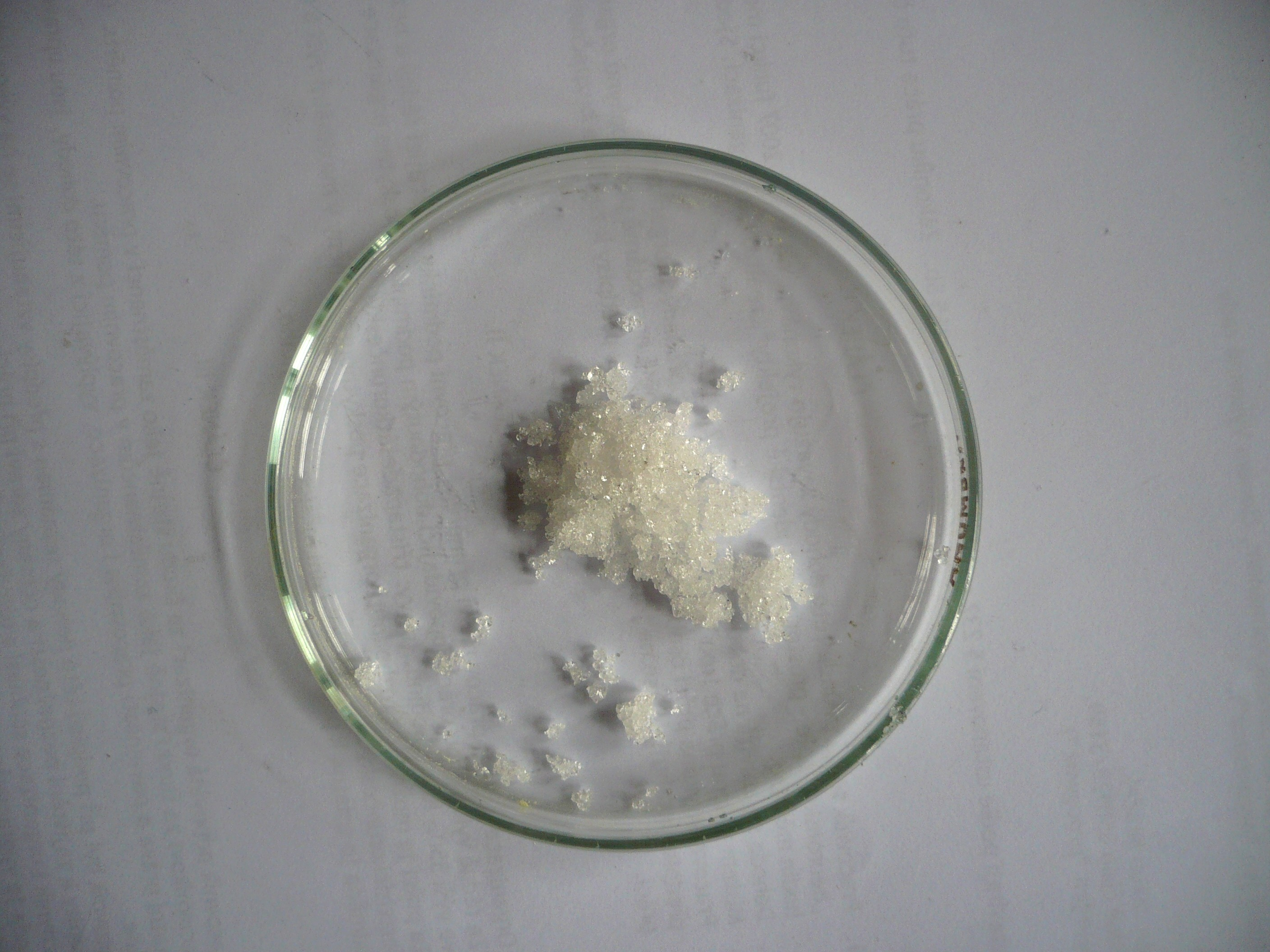

Names
- Other names Potassium sulfocyanate Potassium isothiocyanate (tautomeric form); Potassium thiocyanide Potassium rhodanide

Identifiers
CAS Number	333-20-0
3D model (JSmol)	Interactive image
Beilstein Reference	3594799
ChEBI	CHEBI:30951
ChemSpider	9150
ECHA InfoCard	100.005.792
EC Number	206-370-1
Gmelin Reference	21362
PubChem CID	516872
RTECS number	XL1925000
UNII	TM7213864A
CompTox Dashboard (EPA)	DTXSID7029619
- InChI: InChI=1S/CHNS.K/c2-1-3;/h3H;/q;+1/p-1 Key: ZNNZYHKDIALBAK-UHFFFAOYSA-M; InChI=1/CHNS.K/c2-1-3;/h3H;/q;+1/p-1 Key: ZNNZYHKDIALBAK-REWHXWOFAT
- SMILES: C(#N)[S-].[K+]

Properties
Chemical formula	KSCN
Molar mass	97.181 g mol^{−1}
Appearance	Colorless deliquescent crystals
Odor	Odorless
Density	1.886 g/cm^{3}
Melting point	173.2 °C (343.8 °F; 446.3 K)
Boiling point	500 °C (932 °F; 773 K) (decomposes)
Solubility in water	177 g/100 mL (0 °C); 217 g/100 mL (20 °C)
Solubility	acetone: 21.0 g/100 mL ethanol: soluble
Magnetic susceptibility (χ)	−48.0·10^{−6} cm^{3}/mol

Hazards
- GHS labelling
Pictograms	(GHS05: Corrosive) (GHS07: Exclamation mark)
Signal word	Warning
Hazard statements	H302, H312, H318, H319, H332, H412
Precautionary statements	P261, P264, P270, P271, P273, P280, P301+P312, P302+P352, P304+P312, P304+P340, P305+P351+P338, P310, P312, P322, P330, P337+P313, P363, P501
NFPA 704 (fire diamond)	2 0 0
- Lethal dose or concentration (LD, LC)
LD_{50} (median dose)	854 mg/kg (oral, rat)
Safety data sheet (SDS)	ICSC 1088

Related compounds
Other anions	Potassium cyanate Potassium cyanide
Other cations	Sodium thiocyanate Ammonium thiocyanate
- Except where otherwise noted, data are given for materials in their standard state (at 25 °C [77 °F], 100 kPa). verify (what is ?) Infobox references

Potassium thiocyanate is the chemical compound with the molecular formula KSCN. It is an important salt of the thiocyanate anion, one of the pseudohalides. The compound has a low melting point relative to most other inorganic salts.

== Uses ==
=== Chemical synthesis ===
Aqueous KSCN reacts almost quantitatively with Pb(NO_{3})_{2} to give Pb(SCN)_{2}, which has been used to convert acyl chlorides to isothiocyanates.

KSCN converts ethylene carbonate to ethylene sulfide. For this purpose, the KSCN is first melted under vacuum to remove water. In a related reaction, KSCN converts cyclohexene oxide to the corresponding episulfide and KOCN.

C_{6}H_{10}O + KSCN → C_{6}H_{10}S + KOCN

KSCN is also the starting product for the synthesis of carbonyl sulfide.

=== Special effects ===
Dilute aqueous KSCN is occasionally used for moderately realistic blood effects in film and theatre. It can be painted onto a surface or kept as a colorless solution. When in contact with ferric chloride solution (or other solutions containing Fe^{3+}), the product of the reaction is a solution with a blood red colour, due to the formation of the thiocyanatoiron complex ion. Thus this chemical is often used to create the effect of 'stigmata'. Because both solutions are colorless, they can be placed separately on each hand. When the hands are brought into contact, the solutions react and the effect looks remarkably like stigmata.

=== Laboratory ===
The reaction with Fe^{3+} mentioned above is used as a test for Fe^{3+} ions in the laboratory.

=== Law enforcement ===
Approximate cocaine purity can be determined using 1 mL 2% cupric sulphate pentahydrate in dilute HCl, 1 mL 2% potassium thiocyanate and 2 mL of chloroform. The shade of brown shown by the chloroform is proportional to the cocaine content. This test is not cross sensitive to heroin, methamphetamine, benzocaine, procaine and a number of other drugs but other chemicals could cause false positives.
