= Thiocyanate =

Chemical compound

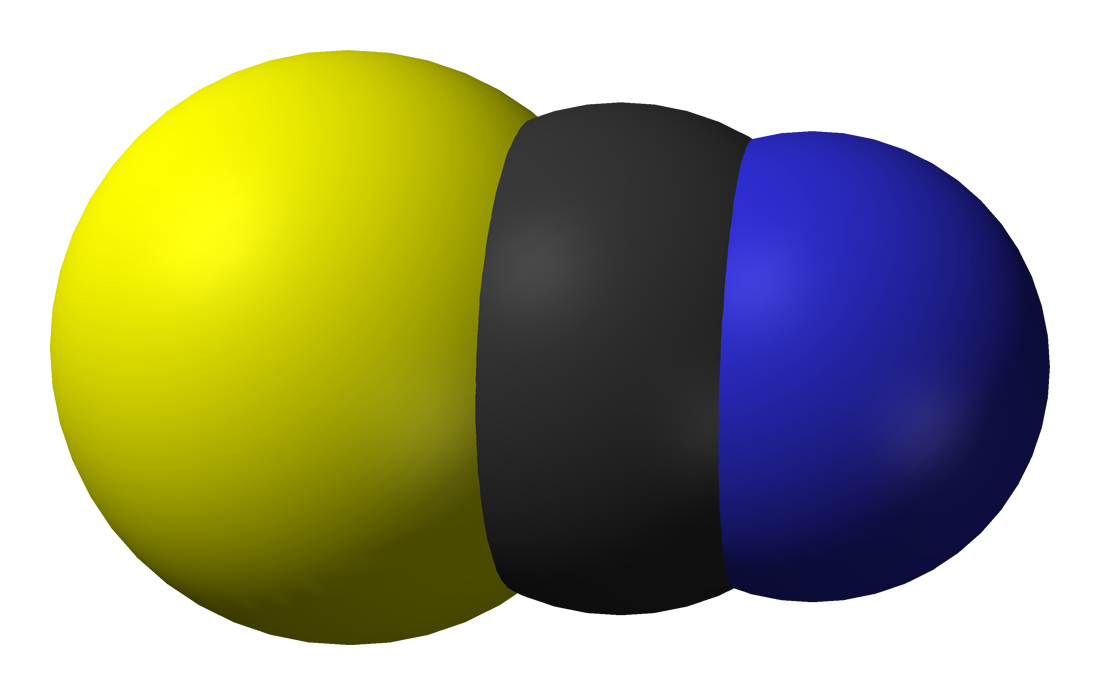

Names
- Preferred IUPAC name Thiocyanate
- Other names: Rhodanide; Sulfocyanate; Sulphocyanate; Thiocyanide; Cyanosulfanide

Identifiers
CAS Number	302-04-5
3D model (JSmol)	[S-C≡N]^{−}: Interactive image; [S=C=N]^{−}: Interactive image
ChEBI	CHEBI:18022
ChEMBL	ChEMBL84336
ChemSpider	8961
IUPHAR/BPS	4529
PubChem CID	9322
UNII	O748SU14OM
- InChI: InChI=1S/CHNS/c2-1-3/h3H/p-1 Key: ZMZDMBWJUHKJPS-UHFFFAOYSA-M; InChI=1/CHNS/c2-1-3/h3H/p-1 Key: ZMZDMBWJUHKJPS-REWHXWOFAX
- SMILES: [S-C≡N]^{−}: [S-]C#N; [S=C=N]^{−}: S=C=[N-]

Properties
Chemical formula	[SCN]^{−}
Molar mass	58.08 g·mol^{−1}
- Except where otherwise noted, data are given for materials in their standard state (at 25 °C [77 °F], 100 kPa). verify (what is ?) Infobox references

Thiocyanates are salts containing the thiocyanate anion [SCN]^{−} (also known as rhodanide or rhodanate). [SCN]^{−} is the conjugate base of thiocyanic acid. Common salts include the colourless salts potassium thiocyanate and sodium thiocyanate. Mercury(II) thiocyanate was formerly used in pyrotechnics.

Thiocyanate is analogous to the cyanate ion, [OCN]^{−}, wherein oxygen is replaced by sulfur. [SCN]^{−} is one of the pseudohalides, due to the similarity of its reactions to that of halide ions. Thiocyanate was historically known as rhodanide (from a Greek word for rose) because of the red colour of its complexes with iron.

Thiocyanate is produced by the reaction of elemental sulfur or thiosulfate with cyanide:

8 CN^{−} + S_{8} → 8 SCN^{−}
CN^{−} + S_{2}O^{2−}_{3} → SCN^{−} + SO^{2−}_{3}

The second reaction is catalyzed by thiosulfate sulfurtransferase, a hepatic mitochondrial enzyme, and by other sulfurtransferases, which together are responsible for around 80% of cyanide metabolism in the body.

Oxidation of thiocyanate inevitably produces bisulfate. The other product depends on pH: in acid, it is hydrogen cyanide, presumably via HOSCN and with a sulfur dicyanide side-product; but in base and neutral solutions, it is cyanate.

== Biology ==
=== Occurrences ===
Thiocyanate occurs widely in nature, although often in low concentrations. It is a component of some sulfur cycles.

=== Biochemistry ===
Thiocyanate hydrolases catalyze the conversion of thiocyanate to carbonyl sulfide and to cyanate:

SCN^{−} + H_{2}O + H^{+} → SCO + NH_{3}
SCN^{−} + H_{2}O → OCN^{−} + H_{2}S

=== Medicine ===
Thiocyanate is known to be an important part in the biosynthesis of hypothiocyanite by a lactoperoxidase. Thus the complete absence of thiocyanate or reduced thiocyanate in the human body, (e.g., cystic fibrosis) is damaging to the human host defense system.

Thiocyanate is a potent competitive inhibitor of the thyroid sodium-iodide symporter. Iodine is an essential component of thyroxine. Since thiocyanates will decrease iodide transport into the thyroid follicular cell, they will decrease the amount of thyroxine produced by the thyroid gland. As such, foodstuffs containing thiocyanate are best avoided by iodide deficient hypothyroid patients.

In the early 20th century, thiocyanate was used in the treatment of hypertension, but it is no longer used because of associated toxicity. Sodium nitroprusside, a metabolite of which is thiocyanate, is however still used for the treatment of a hypertensive emergency. Rhodanese catalyzes the reaction of sodium nitroprusside (like other cyanides) with thiosulfate to form the metabolite thiocyanate.

== Coordination chemistry ==
Structure of Pd(Me_{2}N(CH_{2})_{3}PPh_{2})(SCN)(NCS).

$\ce{S=C=N^\ominus <-> {^{\ominus}S}-C}\ce{#N}$
Resonance structures of the thiocyanate ion

Thiocyanate shares its negative charge approximately equally between sulfur and nitrogen. As a consequence, thiocyanate can act as a nucleophile at either sulfur or nitrogen—it is an ambidentate ligand. [SCN]^{−} can also bridge two (M−SCN−M) or even three metals (>SCN− or −SCN<). Experimental evidence leads to the general conclusion that class A metals (hard acids) tend to form N-bonded thiocyanate complexes, whereas class B metals (soft acids) tend to form S-bonded thiocyanate complexes. Other factors, such as kinetics and solubility, are sometimes involved, and linkage isomerism can occur, for example [Co(NH_{3})_{5}(NCS)]Cl_{2} and [Co(NH_{3})_{5}(SCN)]Cl_{2}. It [SCN] is considered as a weak ligand. ([NCS] is a strong ligand)

=== Test for iron(III) and cobalt(II) ===
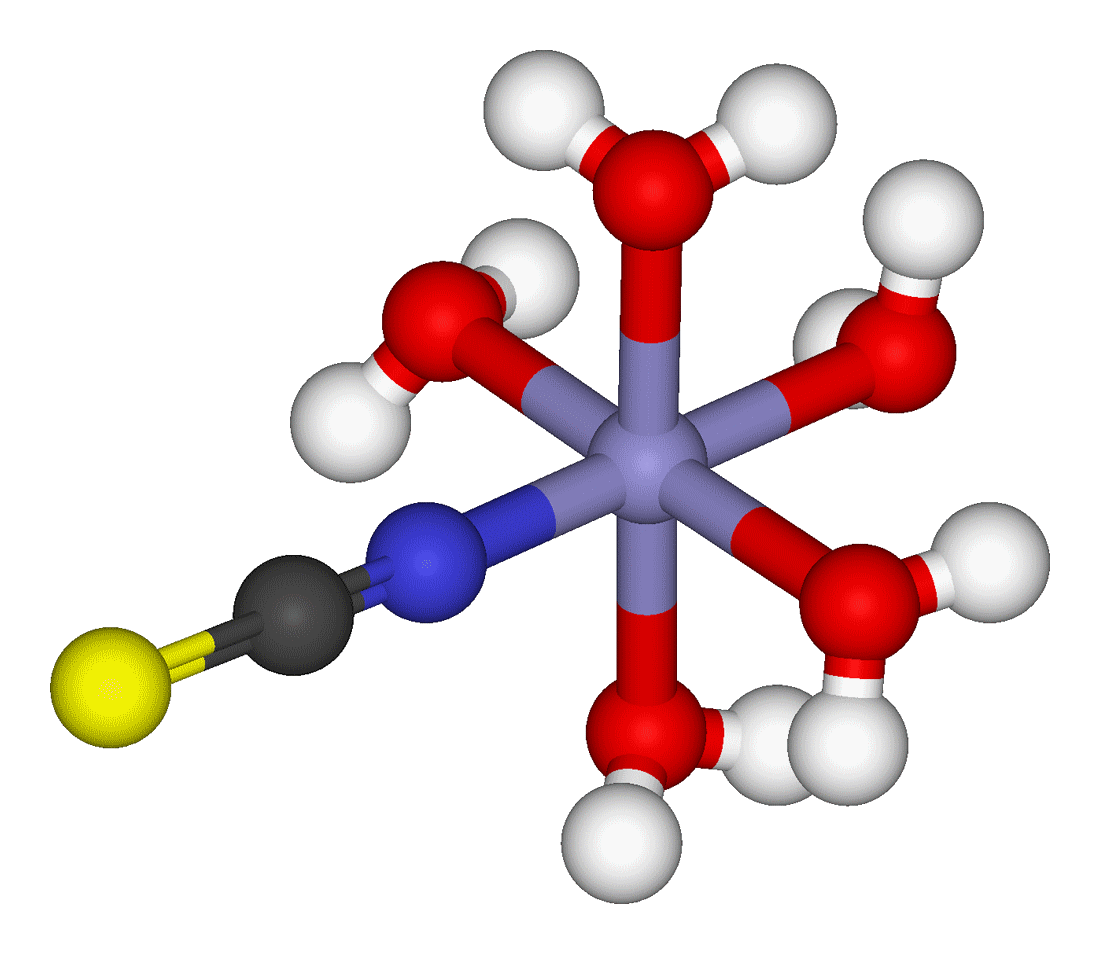

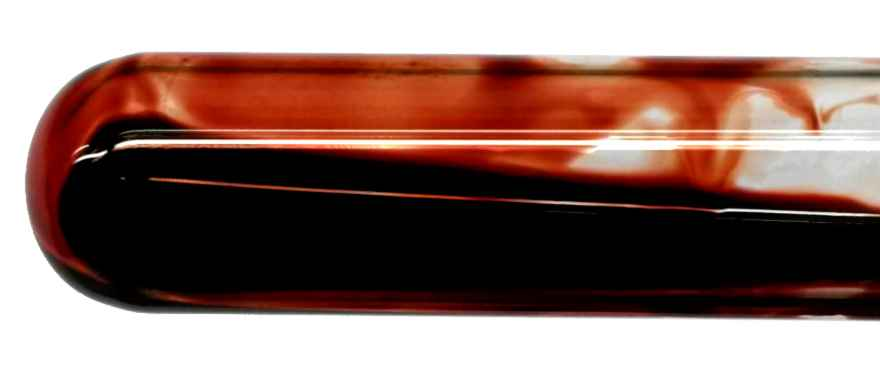
The blood-red colored (up) complex [Fe(NCS)(H_{2}O)_{5}]^{2+} (left) indicates the presence of Fe^{3+} in solution.

If [SCN]^{−} is added to a solution with iron(III) ions, a blood-red solution forms mainly due to the formation of [Fe(NCS)(H_{2}O)_{5}]^{2+}, i.e. pentaaqua(thiocyanato-N)iron(III). Lesser amounts of other hydrated compounds, including Fe(SCN)_{3} and [Fe(SCN)_{4}]^{−}, also form.

Similarly, Co^{2+} gives a blue complex with thiocyanate. Both the iron and cobalt complexes can be extracted into organic solvents like diethyl ether or amyl alcohol. This allows the determination of these ions even in strongly coloured solutions. The determination of Co(II) in the presence of Fe(III) is possible by adding potassium fluoride (KF) to the solution, which forms colourless, very stable complexes with Fe(III), which no longer react with SCN^{−}.

Phospholipids or some detergents aid the transfer of thiocyanatoiron into chlorinated solvents like chloroform and can be determined in this fashion.

== See also ==
- Sulphobes
