= Cyanogen halide =

Molecule

X-C≡N

A cyanogen halide is a molecule consisting of cyanide and a halogen. Cyanogen halides are chemically classified as pseudohalogens.

The cyanogen halides are a group of chemically reactive compounds which contain a cyano group (-CN) attached to a halogen element, that is, fluorine, chlorine, bromine, iodine, or astatine. Cyanogen halides are colorless, volatile, lacrimatory (tear-producing) and highly poisonous compounds.

== Production ==
Halogen cyanides can be obtained by the reaction of halogens with metal cyanides or the halogenation of hydrocyanic acid.

$$\mathrm{MCN + X_2 \longrightarrow XCN + MX}$$
M = metal, X = halogen

Cyanogen fluoride can be obtained by thermal decomposition of cyanuric fluoride.

== Properties ==
Halogen cyanides are stable at normal pressure below 20 °C and in the absence of moisture or acids. In the presence of free halogens or Lewis acids they easily polymerize to cyanuric halides, for example cyanogen chloride to cyanuric chloride. They are very toxic and tear-inducing (lachrymatory). Cyanogen chloride melts at −6 °C and boils at about 150 °C. Bromine cyanide melts at 52 °C and boils at 61 °C. Iodine cyanide sublimates at normal pressure. Cyanogen fluoride boils at −46 °C and polymerizes at room temperature to cyanuric fluoride.

In some of their reactions they resemble halogens. The hydrolysis of cyanogen halides takes place in different ways depending on the electronegativity of the halogen and the resulting different polarity of the X-C bond.

$\mathrm{XCN + 2 \ NaOH \longrightarrow NaOCN + NaX + H_2O}$	(X = F, Cl)
$\mathrm{XCN + 2 \ NaOH \longrightarrow NaOX + NaCN + H_2O }$	(X = Br, I)

Cyanogen fluoride is a gas produced by heating cyanuric fluoride. Cyanogen chloride is a liquid produced by reacting chlorine with hydrocyanic acid.

=== Biomedical effects and metabolism of cyanogen halides ===
Cyanide is naturally present in human tissues in very small quantities. It is metabolized by rhodanese, a live enzyme at a rate of approximately 17 μg/kg·min. Rhodanese catalyzes the irreversible reaction forming thiocyanate from cyanide and sulfane which is non-toxic and can be excreted through the urine. Under normal conditions, availability of sulfane is the limiting factor which acts as a substrate for rhodanese. Sulfur can be administered therapeutically as sodium thiosulfate to accelerate the reaction. A lethal dose of cyanide is time-dependent because of the body's ability to detoxify and excrete small amounts of cyanide through rhodanese-sulfate catalysis. If an amount of cyanide is absorbed slowly, rhodanese-sulfate may be able to biologically render it non-toxic through catalysis to thiosulfate whereas the same amount administered over a short period of time may be lethal.

== Use ==
Halogen cyanides, in particular cyanogen chloride and cyanogen bromide, are important starting materials for the incorporation of the cyanogen group, the production of other carbonic acid derivatives and heterocycles.

It has been suggested that cyanogen chloride be used by the military as poison gas. Cyanogen bromide is a solid that is prepared by reacting bromine with hydrocyanic acid salts; it has been used as a chemical pesticide against insects and rodents and as a reagent for the study of protein structure. Cyanogen halides have been found to act as electrolytes in liquid solvents, sulfur dioxide, arsenous chloride, and sulfuryl chloride.

== See also ==
- Cyanogen fluoride
- Cyanogen chloride
- Cyanogen bromide
- Cyanogen iodide
