= Cyanogen azide =

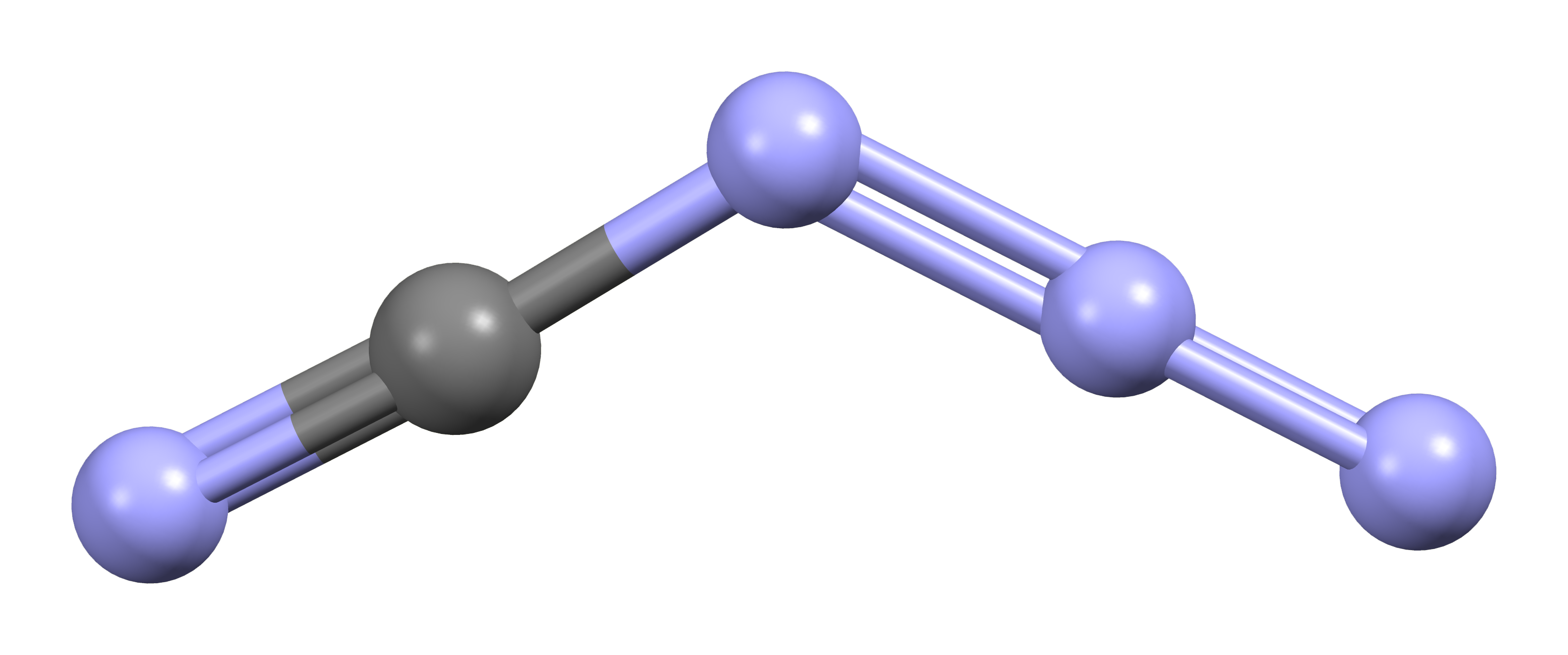

Names
- Preferred IUPAC name Carbononitridic azide
- Other names Cyano azide

Identifiers
CAS Number	764-05-6;
3D model (JSmol)	Interactive image
ChemSpider	120351
PubChem CID	136583
UNII	159Y7EZP9V
CompTox Dashboard (EPA)	DTXSID30997772
- InChI: InChI=1S/CN4/c2-1-4-5-3 Key: KWEDUNSJJZVRKR-UHFFFAOYSA-N
- SMILES: C(#N)N=[N+]=[N-]

Properties
Chemical formula	N_{3}CN
Molar mass	68.039 g·mol^{−1}
Appearance	Colourless oily liquid
- Except where otherwise noted, data are given for materials in their standard state (at 25 °C [77 °F], 100 kPa). Infobox references

Cyanogen azide is a chemical compound with the chemical formula CN_{4}, or more precisely ^{−}N=N^{+}=N−C≡N. It is an azide compound of carbon and nitrogen. It is an oily, colourless liquid at room temperature. It is a highly explosive chemical that is soluble in most organic solvents, and normally handled in dilute solution in this form. It was first synthesised by F. D. Marsh at DuPont Central Research in the early 1960s. There had been earlier claims of discovering it as a crystalline solid, which were incorrect.

Cyanogen azide is a primary explosive, although it is far too unstable for practical use as an explosive and is extremely dangerous outside dilute solution. Its use in chemistry has been as a reagent prepared in situ for use in the synthesis of chemicals such as diaminotetrazoles, either in dilute solution or as a gas at reduced pressure. It can be synthesised at below room temperature from the reaction of sodium azide with either cyanogen chloride or cyanogen bromide, dissolved in a solvent such as acetonitrile; this reaction must be done with care due to the production of shock-sensitive byproducts from trace moisture.
