= 3,4-Dichloro-1,2,5-thiadiazole =

Names
- Preferred IUPAC name Dichloro-1,2,5-thiadiazole

Identifiers
CAS Number	5728-20-1
3D model (JSmol)	Interactive image
ChemSpider	72097
ECHA InfoCard	100.024.757
EC Number	227-232-7
PubChem CID	79804
UNII	PE8RVW5SWM
CompTox Dashboard (EPA)	DTXSID00205896
- InChI: InChI=1S/C2Cl2N2S/c3-1-2(4)6-7-5-1 Key: YNZQOVYRCBAMEU-UHFFFAOYSA-N
- SMILES: C1(=NSN=C1Cl)Cl

Properties
Chemical formula	C_{2}Cl_{2}N_{2}S
Molar mass	155.00 g·mol^{−1}
Density	1.648 g/cm^{3}
Boiling point	158 °C (316 °F; 431 K)

Hazards
- GHS labelling
Pictograms	(GHS06: Toxic) (GHS07: Exclamation mark)
Signal word	Danger
Hazard statements	H301, H315, H319, H335, H412
Precautionary statements	P261, P264, P264+P265, P270, P271, P273, P280, P301+P316, P302+P352, P304+P340, P305+P351+P338, P319, P321, P330, P332+P317, P337+P317, P362+P364, P403+P233, P405, P501
- Except where otherwise noted, data are given for materials in their standard state (at 25 °C [77 °F], 100 kPa). Infobox references

3,4-Dichloro-1,2,5-thiadiazole is the heterocycle with the formula Cl_{2}C_{2}N_{2}S. It is a colorless liquid. The compound is produced by treating cyanogen with disulfur dichloride. The compound can also be prepared from aminoacetonitrile.

It is a planar molecule consisting of a thiadiazole core with two chlorine atoms as substituents. The chloride groups are displaced readily by ammonia to give the diamine:

Cl_{2}C_{2}N_{2}S + 4 NH_{3} → (H_{2}N)_{2}C_{2}N_{2}S + 2 NH_{4}Cl

== Related compounds ==
- 2,1,3-Benzothiadiazole, C_{6}H_{4}N_{2}S, derived from 1,2-diaminobenzene
