= CHNS =

CHNS may refer to:

- CHNS-FM
- Thiocyanic acid
