= Cyanogen =

- Skeletal formula of cyanogen

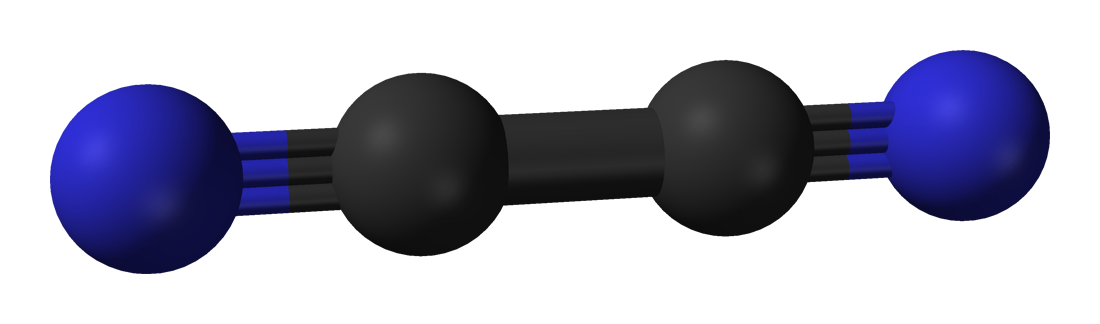
Ball and stick model of cyanogen
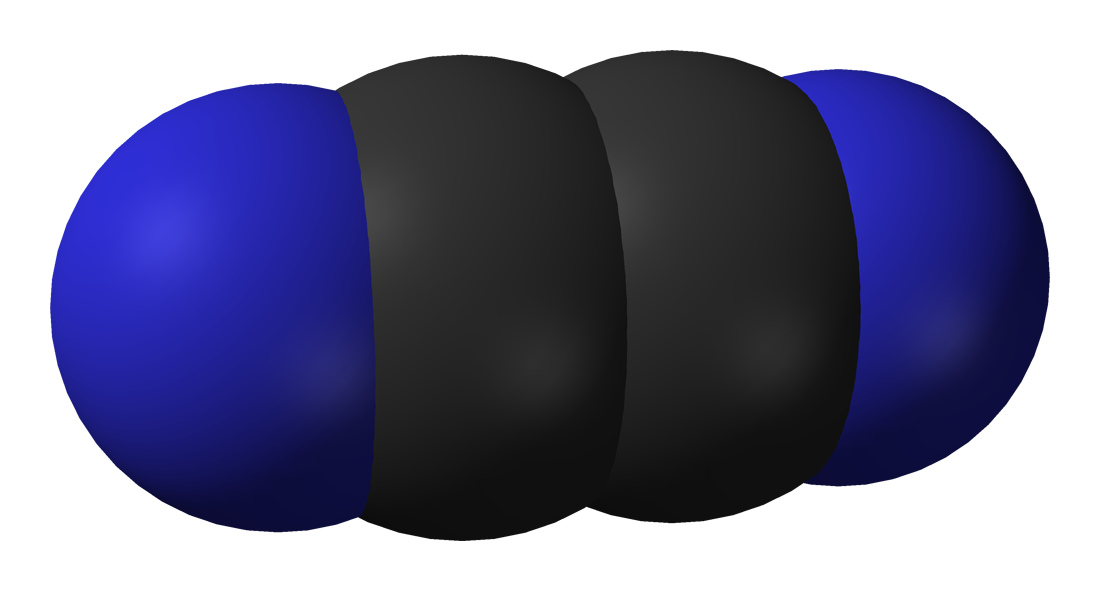
Spacefill model of cyanogen

Names
- Preferred IUPAC name Oxalonitrile
- Systematic IUPAC name Ethanedinitrile
- Other names: Cyanogen; Bis(nitridocarbon)(C—C); Dicyan; Carbon nitride; Oxalic acid dinitrile; Dicyanogen; Nitriloacetonitrile; CY

Identifiers
CAS Number	460-19-5
3D model (JSmol)	Interactive image
Beilstein Reference	1732464
ChEBI	CHEBI:29308
ChemSpider	9605
ECHA InfoCard	100.006.643
EC Number	207-306-5
Gmelin Reference	1090
MeSH	cyanogen
PubChem CID	9999
RTECS number	GT1925000
UNII	534Q0F66RK
UN number	1026
CompTox Dashboard (EPA)	DTXSID1023992
- InChI: InChI=1S/C2N2/c3-1-2-4 Key: JMANVNJQNLATNU-UHFFFAOYSA-N
- SMILES: N#CC#N

Properties
Chemical formula	C_{2}N_{2}
Molar mass	52.036 g·mol^{−1}
Appearance	Colourless gas
Odor	pungent, bitter almond-like
Density	950 mg/mL (at −21 °C)
Melting point	−28 °C (−18 °F; 245 K)
Boiling point	−21.1 °C; −6.1 °F; 252.0 K
Solubility in water	45 g/100 mL (at 20 °C)
Solubility	soluble in ethanol, ethyl ether
Vapor pressure	5.1 atm (21 °C)
Henry's law constant (k_{H})	1.9 μmol/(Pa·kg)
Magnetic susceptibility (χ)	−21.6·10^{−6} cm^{3}/mol
Refractive index (n_{D})	1.327 (18 °C)

Thermochemistry
Std molar entropy (S^{⦵}_{298})	241.57 J/(K·mol)
Std enthalpy of formation (Δ_{f}H^{⦵}_{298})	309.07 kJ/mol
Std enthalpy of combustion (Δ_{c}H^{⦵}_{298})	−1.0978–−1.0942 MJ/mol

Hazards
- Occupational safety and health (OHS/OSH)
Main hazards	forms cyanide in the body; flammable
- GHS labelling
Pictograms	(GHS02: Flammable) (GHS06: Toxic) (GHS09: Environmental hazard)
Signal word	Danger
Hazard statements	H220, H331, H410
Precautionary statements	P210, P261, P271, P273, P304+P340, P311, P321, P377, P381, P391, P403, P403+P233, P405, P501
NFPA 704 (fire diamond)	4 4 2
Explosive limits	6.6–32%
- NIOSH (US health exposure limits)
PEL (Permissible)	none
REL (Recommended)	TWA 10 ppm (20 mg/m^{3})
IDLH (Immediate danger)	N.D.
Safety data sheet (SDS)	inchem.org

Related compounds
Related alkanenitriles	Hydrogen cyanide; Thiocyanic acid; Cyanogen iodide; Cyanogen bromide; Cyanogen chloride; Cyanogen fluoride; Cyanogen azide; Acetonitrile; Aminoacetonitrile; Glycolonitrile; Propionitrile; Aminopropionitrile; Malononitrile; Pivalonitrile; Acetone cyanohydrin
Related compounds	DBNPA
- Except where otherwise noted, data are given for materials in their standard state (at 25 °C [77 °F], 100 kPa). verify (what is ?) Infobox references

Cyanogen is the chemical compound with the formula (CN)_{2}. Its structure is N≡C−C≡N. The simplest stable carbon nitride, it is a colorless and highly toxic gas with a pungent odor. The molecule is a pseudohalogen. Cyanogen molecules are linear, and consist of two CN groups ‒ analogous to diatomic halogen molecules, such as Cl_{2}, but far less oxidizing. The two cyano groups are bonded together at their carbon atoms, though other isomers have been detected. The name is also used for the CN radical, and hence is used for compounds such as cyanogen bromide (Br−C≡N) (but see also Cyano radical). When burned at increased pressure with oxygen, it is possible to get a blue-tinted flame, the temperature of which is about 4,800 °C (8,670 °F) (a higher temperature is possible with ozone). It is as such regarded as the gas with the second-highest temperature of burning (after dicyanoacetylene).

== Preparation ==
Cyanogen is typically generated from cyanide compounds. One laboratory method entails thermal decomposition of mercuric cyanide:

2 Hg(CN)_{2} → (CN)_{2} + Hg_{2}(CN)_{2}

Or, one can combine solutions of copper(II) salts (such as copper(II) sulfate) with cyanides; an unstable copper(II) cyanide is formed which rapidly decomposes into copper(I) cyanide and cyanogen.

2 CuSO_{4} + 4 KCN → (CN)_{2} + 2 CuCN + 2 K_{2}SO_{4}

Another laboratory route is the dehydration of oxamide with phosphorus pentoxide:

oxamide
P_{2}O_{5}
cyanogen

Industrially, it is created by the oxidation of hydrogen cyanide, usually using chlorine over an activated silicon dioxide catalyst or nitrogen dioxide over a copper salt. It is also formed when nitrogen and acetylene are reacted by an electrical spark or discharge.

== Reactions ==
Aqueous solutions of cyanogen slowly decompose to oxamide, its hydration product, together with urea, hydrogen cyanide, and isocyanic acid:

N≡C−C≡N + 2 H_{2}O → H_{2}N−C(=O)−C(=O)−NH_{2}

In mildly alkaline solutions cyanogen disproportionates to cyanide and cyanate, as is typical of pseudohalogens:

N≡C−C≡N + 2 OH^{−} → CN^{−} + OCN^{−} + H_{2}O

Addition of disulfur dichloride to cyanogen gives 3,4-dichloro-1,2,5-thiadiazole.

== Paracyanogen ==
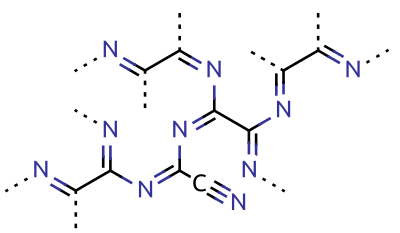
Proposed chemical structure of paracyanogen

Paracyanogen is a polymer of cyanogen. It can be best prepared by heating mercury(II) cyanide. It can also be prepared by heating silver cyanide, silver cyanate, cyanogen iodide or cyanuric iodide. It can also be prepared by the polymerization of cyanogen at 300 to 500 °C (572 to 932 °F) in the presence of trace impurities. Paracyanogen can also be converted back to cyanogen by heating to 800 °C (1,470 °F). Based on experimental evidence, the structure of this polymeric material is thought to be rather irregular, with most of the carbon atoms being of sp^{2} type and localized domains of π conjugation.

== History ==
Cyanogen was first synthesized in 1815 by Joseph Louis Gay-Lussac, who determined its empirical formula and named it. Gay-Lussac coined the word "cyanogène" from the Greek words κυανός (kyanos, blue) and γεννάω (gennao, to create), because cyanide was first isolated by Swedish chemist Carl Wilhelm Scheele from the pigment Prussian blue. It attained importance with the growth of the fertilizer industry in the late 19th century and remains an important intermediate in the production of many fertilizers. It is also used as a stabilizer in the production of nitrocellulose.

Cyanogen is commonly found in comets. In 1910 a spectroscopic analysis of Halley's Comet found cyanogen in the comet's tail, which led to public fear that the Earth would be poisoned as it passed through the tail. People in New York wore gas masks, and merchants sold quack "comet pills" claimed to neutralize poisoning. Because of the extremely diffuse nature of the tail, there was no effect when the planet passed through it.

== Interstellar medium ==
While cyanogen is believed to be abundant in the interstellar medium, it is not able to be directly detected via radio astronomy, as its lack of a dipole moment means it has no rotational microwave spectrum. Its protonated derivative NCCNH^{+} has been detected, as has its less stable isomer isocyanogen (cyanogen cyanide), ^{−}C≡N^{+}−C≡N.

Dimerization of cyanide radicals can also produce a third, even less stable, isomer, diisocyanogen (C=N−N=C), which has been captured via matrix isolation in solid argon at 12 K. As of 2022, it is not known to be present in the interstellar medium.

== Safety ==
Like other cyanides, cyanogen is very toxic, as it readily undergoes reduction to cyanide, which poisons the cytochrome c oxidase complex, thus interrupting the mitochondrial electron transfer chain. Cyanogen gas is an irritant to the eyes and respiratory system. Inhalation can lead to headache, dizziness, rapid pulse, nausea, vomiting, loss of consciousness, convulsions, and death, depending on exposure. Lethal dose through inhalation typically ranges from 100 to 150 milligrams (1.5 to 2.3 grains).

Cyanogen produces the second-hottest-known natural flame (after dicyanoacetylene aka carbon subnitride) with a temperature of over 4,525 °C (8,177 °F) when it burns in oxygen.

== See also ==
- Pseudohalogen
