= C2H3NO =

The molecular formula C_{2}H_{3}NO (molar mass: 57.05 g/mol, exact mass: 57.0215 u) may refer to:

- Glycolonitrile, also called hydroacetolnitrile or formaldehyde cyanohydrin
- Methyl isocyanate (MIC)
