= C2H6N2 =

The molecular formula C_{2}H_{6}N_{2} may refer to:

- Acetamidine
- Azomethane
