= Thiocyanic acid =

Chemical compound (H–S–C≡N)

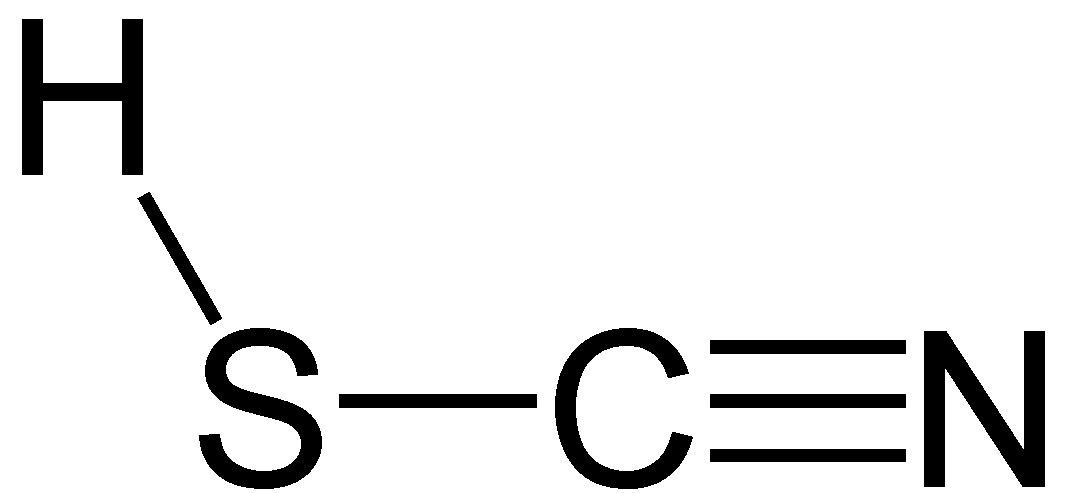
- Skeletal formula of thiocyanic acid with the explicit hydrogen added

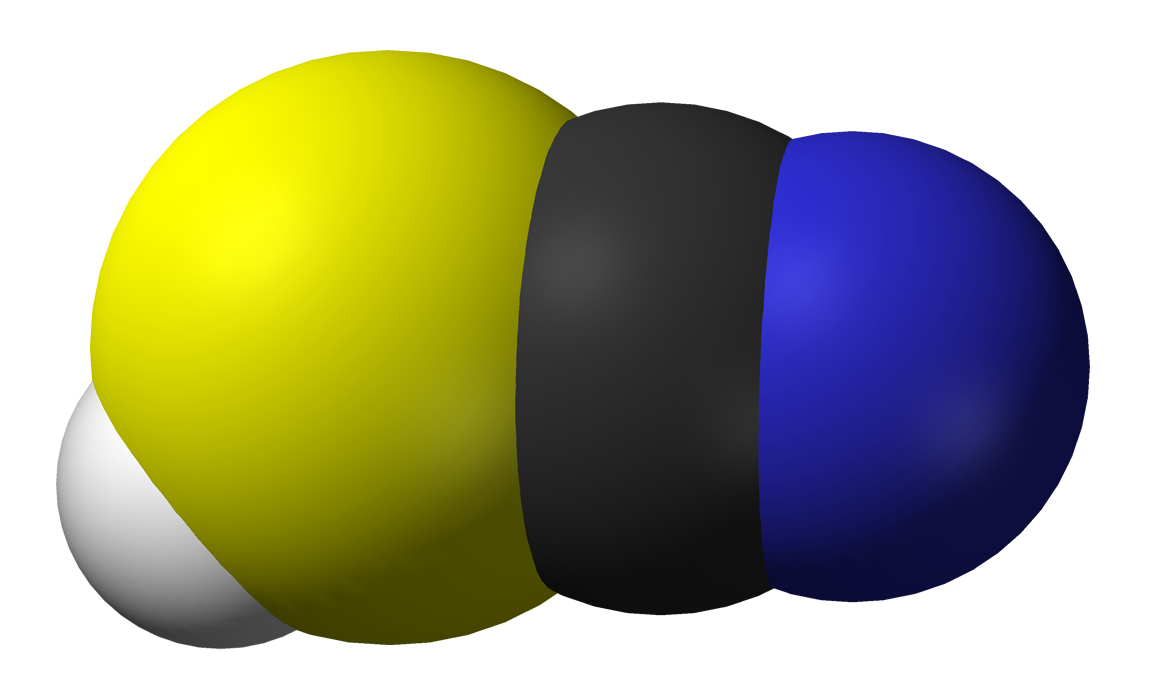
- Spacefill model of thiocyanic acid Carbon, C Sulfur, S Nitrogen, N Hydrogen, H

Names
- IUPAC name Thiocyanic acid
- Other names: Hydrogen thiocyanate; Sulfocyanic acid

Identifiers
CAS Number	463-56-9
3D model (JSmol)	thiocyanic acid: Interactive image; isothiocyanic acid: Interactive image
ChEBI	CHEBI:29200
ChEMBL	ChEMBL84336
ChemSpider	760
ECHA InfoCard	100.006.672
EC Number	207-337-4
Gmelin Reference	25178
KEGG	C01755
MeSH	thiocyanic+acid
PubChem CID	781
UNII	A5KWW7N91V
CompTox Dashboard (EPA)	DTXSID7047221
- InChI: InChI=1S/CHNS/c2-1-3/h3H Key: ZMZDMBWJUHKJPS-UHFFFAOYSA-N
- SMILES: thiocyanic acid: SC#N; isothiocyanic acid: N=C=S

Properties
Chemical formula	HSCN
Molar mass	59.09 g·mol^{−1}
Appearance	Colourless liquid; Colourless gas, autopolymerizing to white solid
Odor	Pungent
Density	2.04 g/cm^{3}
Melting point	5 °C (oligomers?); −110 °C (monomer?)
Solubility in water	Miscible
Solubility	Soluble in ethanol, diethyl ether
log P	0.429
Vapor pressure	4.73 mmHg (631 Pa)
Acidity (pK_{a})	0.926
Basicity (pK_{b})	13.071

Hazards
- GHS labelling
Pictograms	(GHS07: Exclamation mark)
Signal word	Warning
Hazard statements	H302, H312, H332, H412
Precautionary statements	P261, P264, P270, P271, P273, P280, P301+P312, P302+P352, P304+P312, P304+P340, P312, P322, P330, P363, P501

Related compounds
Related compounds	Cyanic acid; Potassium selenocyanate; Hydrogen cyanide; Cyanogen iodide; Cyanogen bromide; Cyanogen chloride; Cyanogen fluoride; Acetonitrile; Aminoacetonitrile; Glycolonitrile; Cyanogen
- Except where otherwise noted, data are given for materials in their standard state (at 25 °C [77 °F], 100 kPa). verify (what is ?) Infobox references

Thiocyanic acid is a chemical compound with the formula HSCN and structure H−S−C≡N, which exists as a tautomer with isothiocyanic acid (H−N=C=S). The isothiocyanic acid tautomer tends to dominate with the compound being about 95% isothiocyanic acid in the vapor phase.

Tautomerism between thiocyanic acid (left) and isothiocyanic acid (right)

It is a moderately strong acid, with a pK_{a} of 1.1 at 20 °C and extrapolated to zero ionic strength.

One of the thiocyanic acid tautomers, HSCN, is predicted to have a triple bond between carbon and nitrogen. Thiocyanic acid has been observed spectroscopically.

The salts and esters of thiocyanic acid are known as thiocyanates. The salts are composed of the thiocyanate ion ([SCN]^{−}) and a suitable cation (e.g., potassium thiocyanate, KSCN). The esters of thiocyanic acid have the general structure R−S−C≡N, where R stands for an organyl group.

Isothiocyanic acid, HNCS, is a Lewis acid whose free energy, enthalpy and entropy changes for its 1:1 association with a variety of Lewis bases in carbon tetrachloride solution at 25 °C have been reported.< HNCS acceptor properties are discussed in the ECW model. The salts are composed of the thiocyanate ion ([SCN]^{−}) and a suitable cation (e.g., ammonium thiocyanate, [NH_{4}]^{+}[SCN]^{−}). Isothiocyanic acid forms isothiocyanates R−N=C=S, where R stands for an organyl group.

Thiocyanuric acid is a stable trimer of thiocyanic acid.
