= Dicyanoacetylene =

Organic compound (N≡C–C≡C–C≡N)

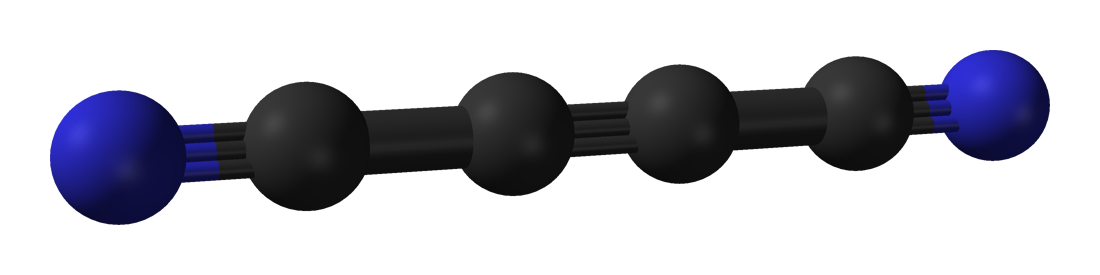

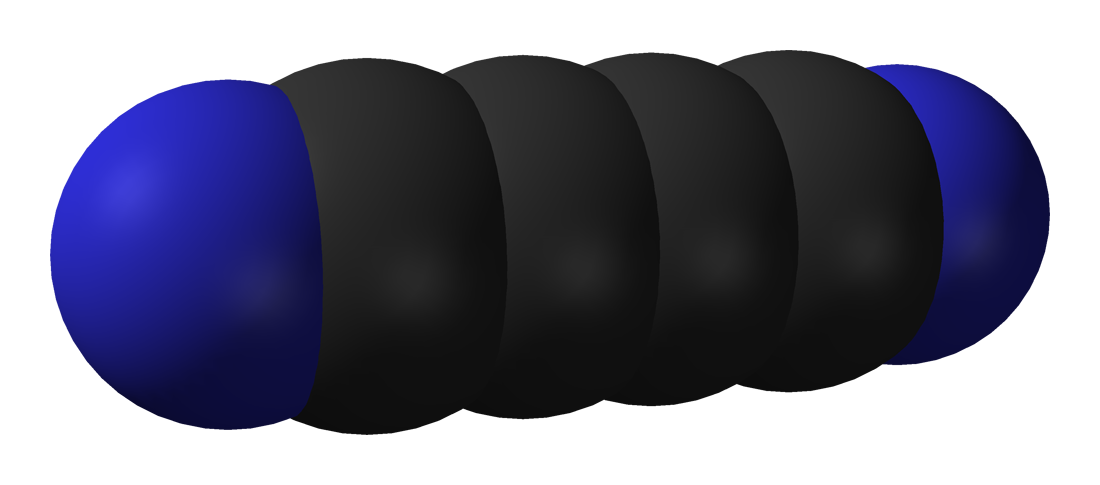

Names
- Preferred IUPAC name But-2-ynedinitrile
- Other names: Acetylenedicarbonitrile; Butynedinitrile; Carbon subnitride; Dicyanoacetylene

Identifiers
CAS Number	1071-98-3
3D model (JSmol)	Interactive image
ChemSpider	13449
PubChem CID	14068
CompTox Dashboard (EPA)	DTXSID50147919
- InChI: InChI=1S/C4N2/c5-3-1-2-4-6 Key: ZEHZNAXXOOYTJM-UHFFFAOYSA-N; InChI=1/C4N2/c5-3-1-2-4-6 Key: ZEHZNAXXOOYTJM-UHFFFAOYAR
- SMILES: N#CC#CC#N

Properties
Chemical formula	C_{4}N_{2}
Molar mass	76.058 g·mol^{−1}
Appearance	Colorless volatile liquid
Odor	Strong
Density	0.907 g/cm^{3}
Melting point	20.5 °C (68.9 °F; 293.6 K)
Boiling point	76.5 °C (169.7 °F; 349.6 K)
Solubility	Soluble in organic solvents

Thermochemistry
Heat capacity (C)	77.6017 J/(mol·K)
Std enthalpy of formation (Δ_{f}H^{⦵}_{298})	+500.4 kJ/mol

Hazards
- Occupational safety and health (OHS/OSH)
Main hazards	Very flammable. Explosive.

Related compounds
Related compounds	Carbon suboxide; Cyanogen; Cyanoacetylene
- Except where otherwise noted, data are given for materials in their standard state (at 25 °C [77 °F], 100 kPa). verify (what is ?) Infobox references

Dicyanoacetylene, also called carbon subnitride or but-2-ynedinitrile (IUPAC), is a compound of carbon and nitrogen with chemical formula C_{4}N_{2}. At room temperature, dicyanoacetylene is a colorless volatile liquid. It has a linear molecular structure, N≡C−C≡C−C≡N (often abbreviated as NC_{4}N), with alternating triple and single covalent bonds. It can be viewed as acetylene with the two hydrogen atoms replaced by cyanide groups.

Because of its high endothermic heat of formation, dicyanoacetylene can explode to carbon powder and nitrogen gas, and it burns in oxygen with a bright blue-white flame at a temperature of 5,260 K (4,990 °C; 9,010 °F), the hottest flame in oxygen; burned in ozone at high pressure the flame temperature exceeds 6,000 K (5,730 °C; 10,340 °F). Dicyanoacetylene polymerizes at room temperature into a dark solid.

== Synthesis ==
Dicyanoacetylene can be prepared by passing nitrogen gas over a sample of graphite heated to temperatures between 2,673 and 3,000 K (2,400 and 2,727 °C; 4,352 and 4,940 °F). It may also be synthesized via a reaction between a dihaloacetylene and a cyanide salt:

X−C≡C−X + 2 MCN → N≡C−C≡C−C≡N + 2 MX

== As a reagent in organic chemistry ==
Dicyanoacetylene is a powerful dienophile because the cyanide groups are electron-withdrawing, so it is a useful reagent for Diels–Alder reactions with unreactive dienes. It even adds to the aromatic compound durene (1,2,4,5-tetramethylbenzene) to form a substituted bicyclooctatriene. Only the most reactive of dienophiles can attack such aromatic compounds.

== In outer space ==
Solid dicyanoacetylene has been detected in the atmosphere of Titan by infrared spectroscopy. As the seasons change on Titan, the compound condenses and evaporates in a cycle, which allows scientists on Earth to study Titanian meteorology.

As of 2006, the detection of dicyanoacetylene in the interstellar medium has been impossible, because its symmetry means it has no rotational microwave spectrum. However, similar asymmetric molecules like cyanoacetylene have been observed, and its presence in those environments is therefore suspected.

== See also ==
- Cyanogen, N≡C−C≡N
- Diacetylene, H−C≡C−C≡C−H
- Cyanopolyynes
