= Acetamidine =

Names
- IUPAC name Ethanimidamide
- Other names: Acetamidine; Ethanamidine

Identifiers
CAS Number	143-37-3
3D model (JSmol)	Interactive image
Beilstein Reference	605302
ChEBI	CHEBI:38478
ChEMBL	ChEMBL2227684
ChemSpider	60515
Gmelin Reference	323199
PubChem CID	67171
UNII	RK19732OQB
CompTox Dashboard (EPA)	DTXSID00162273
- InChI: InChI=1S/C2H6N2/c1-2(3)4/h1H3,(H3,3,4) Key: OQLZINXFSUDMHM-UHFFFAOYSA-N
- SMILES: CC(=N)N

Properties
Chemical formula	C_{2}H_{6}N_{2}
Molar mass	58.084 g·mol^{−1}
Appearance	Colorless crystalline solid
Melting point	66 °C (151 °F; 339 K)

Hazards
- GHS labelling
Pictograms	(GHS08: Health hazard)
Signal word	Warning
Hazard statements	H315, H319, H335
Precautionary statements	P261, P264, P271, P280, P302+P352, P304+P340, P305+P351+P338, P312, P321, P332+P313, P337+P313, P362, P403+P233, P405, P501

Related compounds
Related compounds	Acetic acid; Acetamide; Formamidine
- Except where otherwise noted, data are given for materials in their standard state (at 25 °C [77 °F], 100 kPa). Infobox references

Acetamidine is an organic compound with the chemical formula CH_{3}C(NH)NH_{2}, one of the simplest amidines. Its structural formula is H_{3}C−C(=NH)−NH_{2}. It is a colorless crystalline solid. It is a nitrogen analog of acetic acid H_{3}C−C(=O)−OH, where the carbonyl oxygen =O is replaced by imino group =NH, and the hydroxyl group −OH is replaced by amino group −NH_{2}.

Acetamidine also refers to the group of compounds called acetamidines, whose formula is H_{3}C−C(=NR)−NR'R", where R, R' and R" are typically hydrogen, halogen or organyl.

Acetamidine is usually available as its hydrochloride salt, acetamidinium chloride ([CH_{3}C(NH_{2})_{2}]^{+}Cl^{−}).

== Structure ==
In the molecule of acetamidine, nonhydrogen atoms and hydrogen atoms attached to the nitrogen atoms are coplanar, thus, the molecule is trigonal planar at the nonmethyl carbon atom. The rotational barrier of the methyl group is very small. Crystals of acetamidine are tetragonal, with these parameters: a = 10.964 Å, c = 5.701 Å, Z = 8 and V = 685.3 Å^{3}, with P4_{2}/n space group. The molecules are connected by a hydrogen bond by =NH and −NH_{2} groups.

== Uses ==
Acetamidine (and other acetamidines) is used for the synthesis of heterocycles such as quinazoline, pyrrole, imidazole, purine, pyrimidine, triazine, and their derivatives, which play an important role in biochemistry and medicinal chemistry.

== Reactions ==
The free base of acetamidine is hygroscopic. It decomposes into ammonia and acetonitrile at high temperatures, and produces acetamidinium carbonate [CH_{3}C(NH_{2})_{2}]_{2}CO_{3} during one day at room temperature when stored in air. Because of that, it is unsuitable as a starting material for synthesis and the use of an acetamidinium salt is necessary. Acetamidinium cation forms salts with various counterions, such as sulfate, hydrogensulfate, formate, acetate, oxalate, chloride, perchlorate, nitrate, and dinitromethanide.

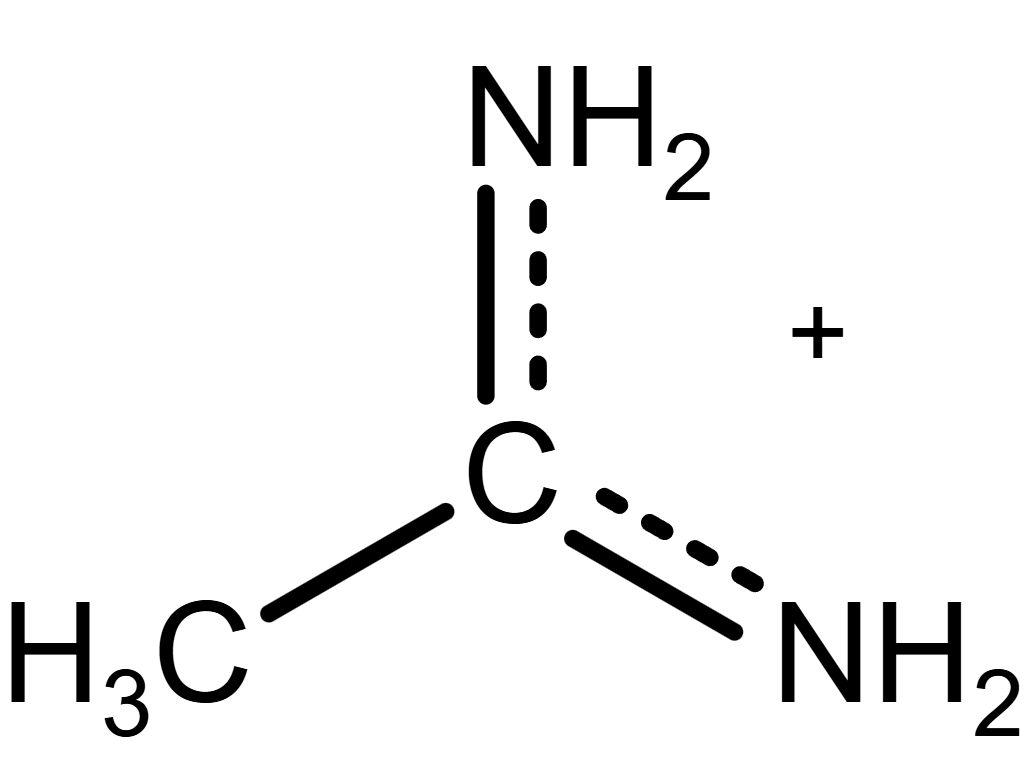
Structure of the acetamidinium cation
