= Large Molecule Heimat =

Dense gas cloud

Molecular cloud

Observation data: J2000.0 epoch
- Right ascension: 17^{h} 47^{m} 20.0^{s}
- Declination: −28° 22′ 17″
- Constellation: Sagittarius

Physical characteristics
- Radius: 0.3 ly

The Large Molecule Heimat is a dense gas cloud located in the molecular cloud Sagittarius B2. Many species of molecule, including aminoacetonitrile (a molecule related to glycine), ethyl formate, and butyronitrile, have been detected in the Large Molecule Heimat.
