= Cyanogen iodide =

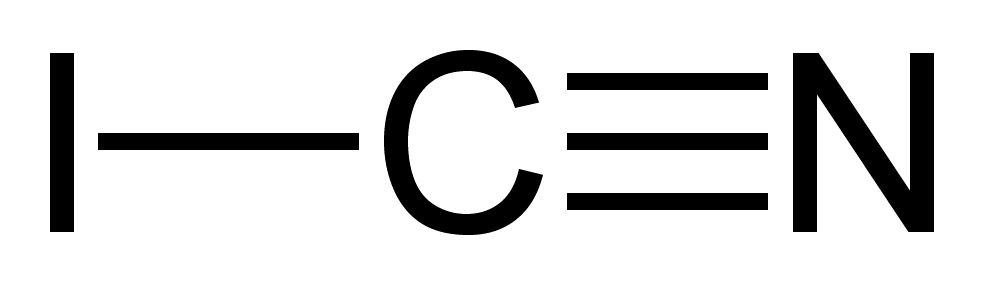
- Skeletal formula of cyanogen iodide

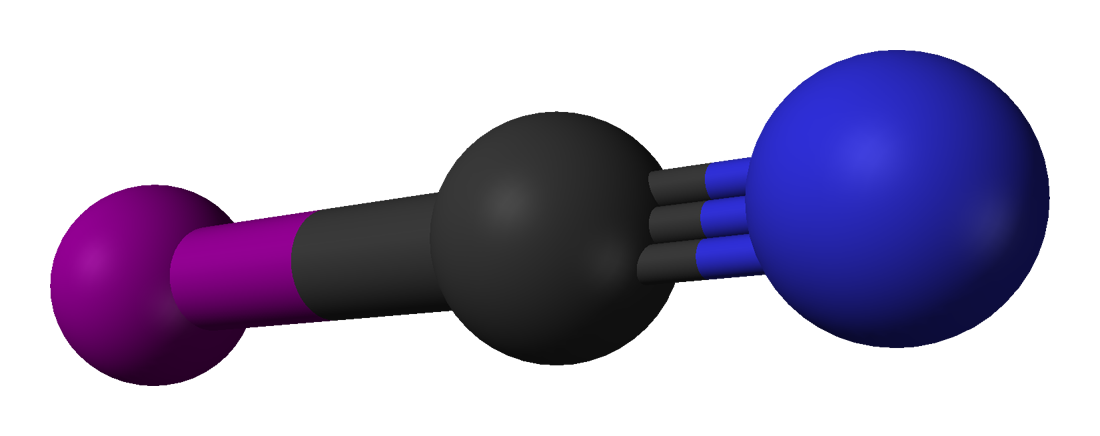
Ball and stick model of cyanogen iodide
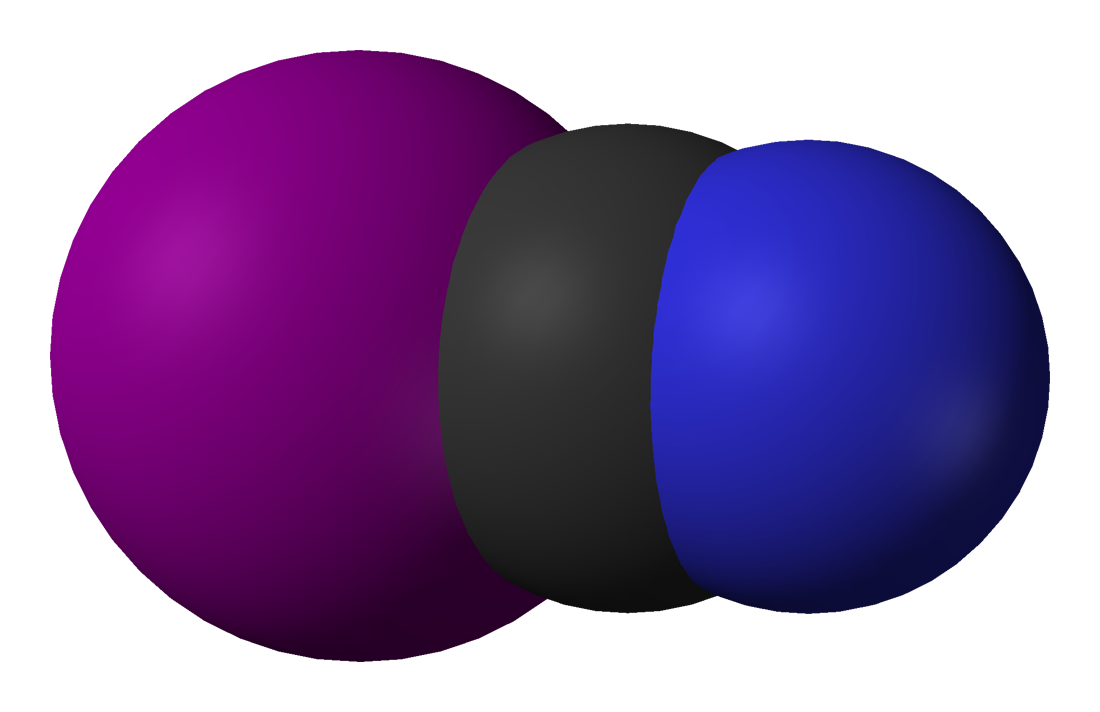
Spacefill model of cyanogen iodide

Names
- Preferred IUPAC name Carbononitridic iodide
- Other names Iodine cyanide

Identifiers
| CAS Number | 506-78-5 |
| 3D model (JSmol) | Interactive image |
| ChemSpider | 10046 |
| ECHA InfoCard | 100.007.322 |
| EC Number | 208-053-3 |
| PubChem CID | 10478 |
| RTECS number | NN1750000 |
| UNII | 81ESV254UF |
| CompTox Dashboard (EPA) | DTXSID50870573 |
- InChI: InChI=1S/CIN/c2-1-3 Key: WPBXOELOQKLBDF-UHFFFAOYSA-N
- SMILES: IC#N

Properties
| Chemical formula | ICN |
| Molar mass | 152.9219 g/mol |
| Appearance | White crystals |
| Density | 2.84 g/cm^{3} |
| Melting point | 146.7 °C (296.1 °F; 419.8 K) |
| Solubility in water | Reacts |
| Vapor pressure | 0.001 bar (298.4 K) |

Thermochemistry
| Std enthalpy of formation (Δ_{f}H^{⦵}_{298}) | 160.5–169.1 kJ/mol |

Hazards
| NFPA 704 (fire diamond) | 3 0 0 |

Related compounds
| Related alkanenitriles | Hydrogen cyanide; Thiocyanic acid; Cyanogen bromide; Cyanogen chloride; Cyanogen fluoride; Acetonitriles; Aminoacetonitrile; Glycolonitrile; Cyanogen |
- Except where otherwise noted, data are given for materials in their standard state (at 25 °C [77 °F], 100 kPa). verify (what is ?) Infobox references

Cyanogen iodide or iodine cyanide is a compound with the chemical formula ICN. It is a pseudohalogen composed of iodine and the cyanide group. It is a highly toxic inorganic compound. It occurs as white crystals that react slowly with water to form hydrogen cyanide. The atoms in this compound's molecules are arranged linearly, having the structural formula I−C≡N.

== Synthesis ==
Cyanogen iodide is prepared by combining I_{2} and a cyanide, most commonly sodium cyanide in ice-cold water. The product is extracted with diethyl ether.

I_{2} + NaCN → NaI + ICN

== Applications ==
Cyanogen iodide has been used in taxidermy as a preservative because of its toxicity.

== History ==
Cyanogen iodide was first synthesized in 1824 by the French chemist Georges-Simon Serullas (1774–1832).

Cyanogen iodide was considered one of the impurities in commercially sold iodine before the 1930s.

== Hazards ==
Cyanogen iodide is toxic if inhaled or ingested and may be fatal if swallowed or absorbed through the skin. Cyanogen iodide may cause convulsions, paralysis and death from respiratory failure. It is a strong irritant and may cause burns to the eyes and skin if contacted. If cyanogen iodide is heated enough to undergo complete decomposition, it may releases toxic fumes of nitrogen oxides, cyanide and iodide. A fire may cause the release of poisonous gases. Cyanogen iodide decomposes when contacted with acids, bases, ammonia, alcohols, and with heating. ICN slowly reacts with water or carbon dioxide to produce hydrogen cyanide.

It is classified as an extremely hazardous substance in the United States as defined in Section 302 of the U.S. Emergency Planning and Community Right-to-Know Act (42 U.S.C. 11002), and is subject to strict reporting requirements by facilities which produce, store, or use it in significant quantities.

== Solutions in pyridine ==
Cyanogen iodide solutions in pyridine conduct electric current. Dilute solutions of ICN in pyridine are colorless at first, but upon standing become successively yellow, orange, red-brown and deep red-brown. This effect is due to a change in conductivity, which in turn is due to the formation of an electrolyte. When electrical conductivity of ICN is compared with that of iodine-pyridine solutions, the formation of the electrolyte in ICN proceeds much more slowly. Results confirm that cyanides are much weaker salts in pyridine than are iodides, although cyanogen iodide solutions are able to be dissolved in pyridine giving solutions with electrical conductivity that increases over time and results in maximum values.
