= Acetamidine hydrochloride =

Names
- IUPAC name Ethanimidamide hydrochloride
- Other names: Acetamidinium chloride; Ethanimidamide monohydrochloride

Identifiers
CAS Number	124-42-5
3D model (JSmol)	Interactive image
ChemSpider	60514
ECHA InfoCard	100.004.274
EC Number	204-700-9
PubChem CID	67170
UNII	M2026K4JCF
CompTox Dashboard (EPA)	DTXSID2059564
- InChI: InChI=1S/C2H6N2.ClH/c1-2(3)4;/h1H3,(H3,3,4);1H Key: WCQOBLXWLRDEQA-UHFFFAOYSA-N
- SMILES: Cl.N=C(N)C

Properties
Chemical formula	C_{2}H_{7}ClN_{2}
Molar mass	94.54 g·mol^{−1}
Appearance	colourless monoclinic crystals

Structure
Crystal structure	Monoclinic
Space group	C2/c
Lattice constant	a = 11.673, b = 9.862, c = 9.601 α = 90°, β = 111.71°, γ = 90°

Hazards
- GHS labelling
Pictograms	(GHS07: Exclamation mark)
Signal word	Warning
Hazard statements	H315, H319, H335
Precautionary statements	P261, P264, P271, P280, P302+P352, P304+P340, P305+P351+P338, P312, P362+P364, P403+P233, P501
NFPA 704 (fire diamond)	2 0 0
- Except where otherwise noted, data are given for materials in their standard state (at 25 °C [77 °F], 100 kPa). Infobox references

Acetamidine hydrochloride or acetamidinium chloride is an organic compound with the formula [CH_{3}C(NH_{2})_{2}]^{+}Cl^{−}, used in the synthesis of many nitrogen-bearing compounds. It is the hydrochloride of acetamidine, one of the simplest amidines.

== Properties ==
Acetamidine hydrochloride is a hygroscopic solid which forms colourless monoclinic crystals. It is soluble in water and alcohol.

It releases ammonium chloride upon heating. Dry acetamidine hydrochloride releases acetonitrile, while in aqueous solution, it instead undergoes hydrolysis to acetic acid and ammonia.

[CH_{3}C(NH_{2})_{2}]Cl → CH_{3}CN + [NH_{4}]Cl
[CH_{3}C(NH_{2})_{2}]Cl + 2 H_{2}O → CH_{3}COOH + NH_{3} + [NH_{4}]Cl

As free base amidines are strong Lewis bases, acetamidine hydrochloride is a weak Lewis acid. Treatment with strong base gives free base acetamidine:

[CH_{3}C(NH_{2})_{2}]Cl + KOH → CH_{3}C(NH)NH_{2} + KCl + H_{2}O

== Synthesis ==
Acetamidine hydrochloride is synthesised in a two-step process that begins with a solution of acetonitrile in ethanol at close to 0 °C. First, the mixture is treated with anhydrous hydrogen chloride in a Pinner reaction, producing crystals of ethyl acetimidate hydrochloride:

H_{3}C−C≡N + C_{2}H_{5}OH + HCl → H_{3}C−C(=NH^{+}_{2}Cl^{−})−OC_{2}H_{5}

This imino ether salt is then treated with an excess of ammonia in dry ethanol, converting it to the amidine:

H_{3}C−C(=NH^{+}_{2}Cl^{−})−OC_{2}H_{5} + NH_{3} → [H_{3}C−C(NH_{2})_{2}]^{+}Cl^{−} + C_{2}H_{5}OH

All reagents must be thoroughly dried using a strong desiccant such as phosphorus pentoxide, as the intermediate imino ether is susceptible to hydrolysis, yielding ammonium chloride and ethyl formate. Layers of ammonium chloride can form on the imino ether salt, limiting the formation of amidine.

== Applications ==
As a source of amidine, acetamidine hydrochloride is a precursor to the industrial and laboratory synthesis of many nitrogen compounds. It reacts with β-dicarbonyls to produce substituted pyrimidines, with acetaldehydes to form substituted imidazoles, and with imidates to form substituted triazines.

In particular, its reaction with a dicarbonyl intermediate is an early step in the synthesis of thiamine (vitamin B_{1}) and many of its derivatives.
