= Cyanogen fluoride =

- Skeletal formula of cyanogen fluoride

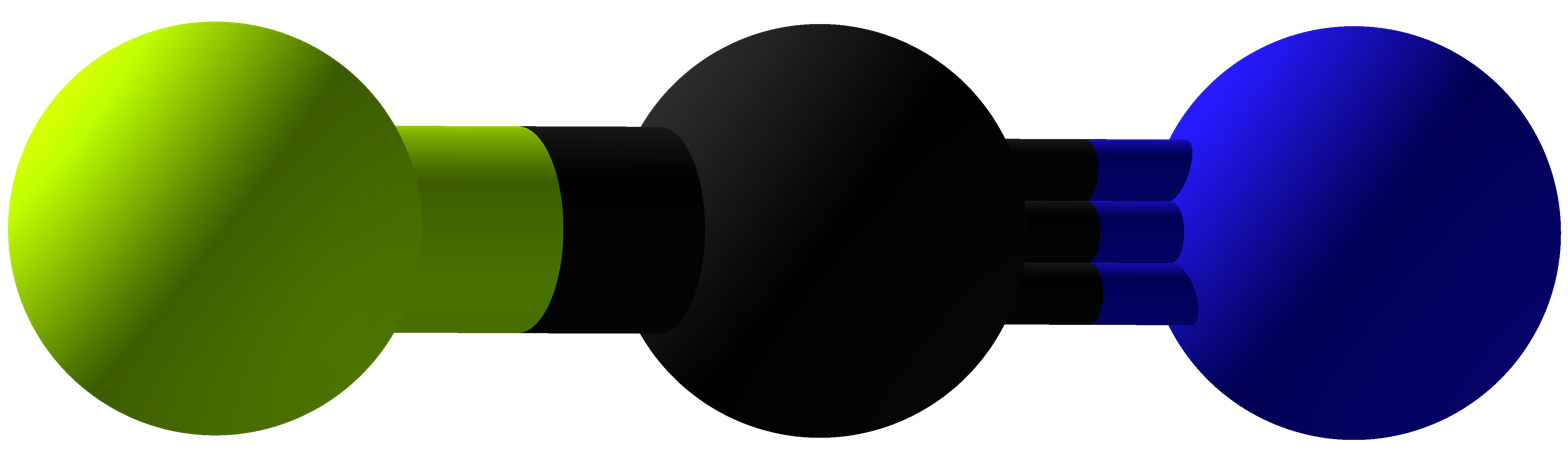

Names
- Preferred IUPAC name Carbononitridic fluoride
- Other names Fluorine cyanide Cyano fluoride Cyanogen fluoride Fluoromethanenitrile

Identifiers
| CAS Number | 1495-50-7 |
| 3D model (JSmol) | Interactive image |
| ChemSpider | 120749 |
| ECHA InfoCard | 100.298.549 |
| PubChem CID | 137036 |
| CompTox Dashboard (EPA) | DTXSID20164330 |
- InChI: InChI=1S/CFN/c2-1-3 Key: CPPKAGUPTKIMNP-UHFFFAOYSA-N
- SMILES: FC#N

Properties
| Chemical formula | FCN |
| Molar mass | 45.0158 g/mol |
| Appearance | Colorless gas |
| Density | 1.026 g/cm^{3} |
| Boiling point | −46 °C (−51 °F; 227 K) |

Thermochemistry
| Std molar entropy (S^{⦵}_{298}) | 225.40 J/(mol·K) |
| Std enthalpy of formation (Δ_{f}H^{⦵}_{298}) | 35.98 kJ/mol |

Hazards
- GHS labelling
| Pictograms | (GHS01: Explosive) (GHS02: Flammable) (GHS06: Toxic) |
| Signal word | Danger |
| NFPA 704 (fire diamond) | 4 0 2 |

Related compounds
| Related compounds | Hydrogen cyanide; Thiocyanic acid; Cyanogen iodide; Cyanogen bromide; Cyanogen chloride; Acetonitrile; Aminoacetonitrile; Glycolonitrile; Cyanogen |
- Except where otherwise noted, data are given for materials in their standard state (at 25 °C [77 °F], 100 kPa). Infobox references

Cyanogen fluoride (IUPAC name: carbononitridic fluoride) is an inorganic compound with the chemical formula FCN. The molecule of this compound is linear, having the structural formula F−C≡N. It consists of a fluorine atom in a single bond with a carbon atom of a cyano group. It is a toxic and explosive gas at room temperature. It is used in organic synthesis and can be produced by pyrolysis of cyanuric fluoride or by fluorination of cyanogen.

== Synthesis ==
Cyanogen fluoride, is synthesized by the pyrolysis of cyanuric fluoride (C_{3}N_{3}F_{3}) at 1300 °C and 50 mmHg pressure; this process gives a maximum of 50% yield. Other products observed were cyanogen and CF_{3}CN. For pyrolysis, an induction heated carbon tube with an internal diameter of 0.75 inches is packed with 4 to 8 mesh carbon granules and is surrounded by graphite powder insulation and a water-jacketed shell. The cyanuric fluoride is pyrolyzed (becoming a pyrolysate) at a rate of 50 g/hr, and appears as fluffy white solid collected in liquid nitrogen traps. These liquid nitrogen traps are filled to atmospheric pressure with nitrogen or helium. This process yields crude cyanogen fluoride, which is then distilled in a glass column at atmospheric pressure to give pure cyanogen fluoride.

Another method of synthesizing cyanogen fluoride is by the fluorination of cyanogen. Nitrogen trifluoride can fluorinate cyanogen to cyanogen fluoride when both the reactants are injected downstream into the nitrogen arc plasma. With carbonyl fluoride and carbon tetrafluoride, FCN was obtained by passing these fluorides through the arc flame and injecting the cyanogen downstream into the arc plasma.

== Properties ==
Cyanogen fluoride is a toxic, colorless gas with a molecular mass of 45.015 g/mol. Cyanogen fluoride has a boiling point of −46.2 °C and a melting point of −82 °C. The stretching constant for the CN bond was 17.5 mdyn/Å and for the CF bond it was 8.07 mdyn/Å, but this can vary depending on the interaction constant. At room temperature, the condensed phase converts rapidly to polymeric materials. Liquid FCN explodes at −41 °C when initiated by a squib.

== Spectroscopy ==
The fluorine NMR pattern for FCN showed that there was a triplet peak centered at 80 ppm (3180 cps) with a 32–34 cps splitting between adjacent peaks because of the ^{14}N nucleus. This splitting is absent near freezing point and it collapses to a singlet peak.

The IR spectrum of FCN shows two doublet bands at around 2290 cm^{−1} (for the C≡N)

and 1078 cm^{−1} (for the C–F). The C–F doublet band has a 24 cm^{−1} separation between the two branches. A triplet band is observed at around 451 cm^{−1}.

== Chemical reactions ==
Cyanogen fluoride reacts with benzene in the presence of aluminium chloride to form benzonitrile in 20% conversion. It also reacts with olefins to yield an alpha,beta-fluoronitriles. FCN also adds to olefins which have internal double bonds in the presence of strong acid catalyst.

== Storage ==
FCN can be stored in a stainless steel cylinders for over a year when the temperature is −78.5 °C (solid carbon dioxide temperature).

== Safety ==
Cyanogen fluoride undergoes violent reaction when in the presence of boron trifluoride or hydrogen fluoride. Pure gaseous FCN at atmospheric pressure and room temperature does not ignite by a spark or hot wire. FCN air mixtures however are more susceptible to ignition and explosion than pure FCN.

== Uses ==
FCN is useful in synthesis of important compounds such as dyes, fluorescent brighteners and photographic sensitizers. It is also very useful as a fluorinating and nitrilating agent. Beta-fluoronitriles, which are produced when FCN is reacted with olefins, are useful intermediates for preparing polymers, beta-fluorocarboxylic acids and other fluorine containing products. Useful amines can be obtained. Cyanogen fluoride is a very volatile fumigant, disinfectant and animal pest killer.
