= Acetonitrile (data page) =

Chemical data page

This page provides supplementary chemical data on acetonitrile.

== Material Safety Data Sheet ==
The handling of this chemical may incur notable safety precautions. It is highly recommend that you seek the Material Safety Datasheet (MSDS) for this chemical from a reliable source and follow its directions.

- SIRI
- Fisher Scientific.

== Structure and properties ==
Structure and properties
Dielectric constant, ε_{r}	36.64 ε_{0} at 20 °C
Surface tension	29.29 dyn/cm

== Thermodynamic properties ==
Phase behavior
Triple point	229.32 K (−43.83 °C), 167 Pa
Std entropy change of fusion, Δ_{fus}S^{~~o~~}	35.61 J/(mol·K) (crystal I → liq)
Std entropy change of vaporization, Δ_{vap}S^{~~o~~}	111.44 J/(mol·K) at 25 °C
Solid properties
Heat capacity, c_{p}	92.36 J/(mol K)at 298.15 K
Std enthalpy change of state transition, Δ_{trs}H^{~~o~~}	0.8979 kJ/mol at −56.2 °C (crystal II → crystal I)
Std entropy change of state transition, Δ_{trs}S^{~~o~~}	4.14 J/(mol·K) at −56.2 °C (crystal II → crystal I)
Liquid properties
Std enthalpy change of formation, Δ_{f}H^{~~o~~}_{liquid}	−40.56 kJ/mol
Standard molar entropy, S^{~~o~~}_{liquid}	149.62 J/(mol K)
Enthalpy of combustion, Δ_{c}H^{~~o~~}	−1256.33 kJ/mol
Heat capacity, c_{p}	91.7 J/(mol K) at 25 °C
Gas properties
Std enthalpy change of formation, Δ_{f}H^{~~o~~}_{gas}	−74.04 kJ/mol

== Vapor pressure of liquid ==
P in mm Hg	1	10	40	100	400	760
T in °C	−47.0_{(s)}	−16.3	7.7	27.0	62.5	81.8

Table data obtained from CRC Handbook of Chemistry and Physics, 44th ed. The "(s)" notation indicates temperature of solid/vapor equilibrium. Otherwise the data is temperature of liquid/vapor equilibrium.

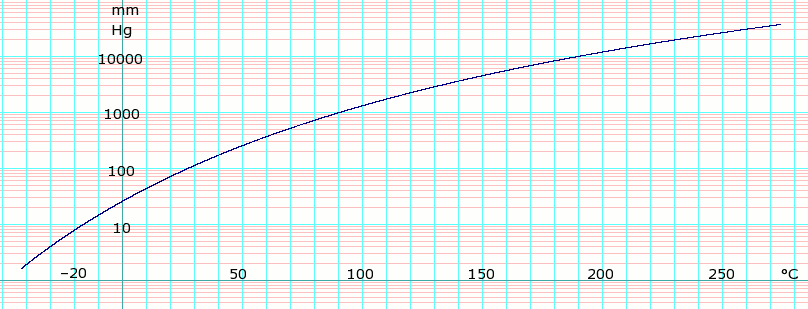
log_{10} of Acetonitrile vapor pressure. Uses formula $\scriptstyle \log_e P_{mmHg} =$$\scriptstyle \log_e (\frac {760} {101.325}) - 3.881710 \log_e(T+273.15) - \frac {4999.618} {T+273.15} + 41.05901 + 3.515956 \times 10^{-06} (T+273.15)^2$ obtained from CHERIC

== Distillation data ==
Vapor-liquid Equilibrium for Acetonitrile/Water; P = 760 mmHg
BP Temp. °C	% by mole acetonitrile
BP Temp. °C	liquid	vapor
86.5	2.9	26.3
81.1	9.3	50.5
80.0	14.2	55.9
78.6	25.4	61.7
77.4	40.2	65.5
76.7	50.7	66.4
76.6	52.7	67.3
76.0	71.8	72.8
76.6	83.9	78.0
76.8	85.6	76.1
80.4	98.6	94.5

Vapor-liquid Equilibrium for Acetonitrile/Methanol; P = 760 mmHg
BP Temp. °C	% by mole methanol
BP Temp. °C	liquid	vapor
79.20	2.5	9.5
77.95	4.0	13.5
76.77	5.5	17.5
75.12	9.7	26.5
73.12	14.0	33.0
72.07	17.0	37.5
70.96	20.0	420
68.85	24.7	45.5
68.39	28.9	50.5
66.00	41.5	59.5
65.35	47.0	62.5
64.75	54.5	65.5
64.34	63.0	71.5
64.03	69.0	74.5
63.80	74.5	78.9
63.77	82.5	82.5
63.76	86.0	86.0
63.87	90.0	88.0
64.05	93.0	91.5
64.18	95.0	93.0
64.40	97.0	95.5

Vapor-liquid Equilibrium for Acetonitrile/Benzene; P = 760 mmHg
BP Temp. °C	% by mole benzene
BP Temp. °C	liquid	vapor
80.6	2.0	4.8
80.4	2.7	6.2
79.0	5.6	12.5
78.5	6.5	14.7
78.0	7.7	16.5
76.0	17.6	29.3
74.9	24.2	35.5
74.4	29.9	39.3
73.8	37.1	43.8
73.7	38.0	44.9
73.4	44.0	48.5
73.2	51.3	51.9
73.0	52.94	52.94
73.2	58.1	54.5
73.4	66.5	60.0
73.8	71.3	62.6
74.0	76.7	65.7
74.4	79.0	68.0
76.3	92.0	80.1

Vapor-liquid Equilibrium for Acetonitrile/Toluene; P = 760 mmHg
BP Temp. °C	% by mole toluene
BP Temp. °C	liquid	vapor
81.5	3.3	5.1
81.4	6.9	8.1
81.1	12.18	12.18
81.3	18.2	15.4
81.4	22.1	17.2
81.8	28.4	19.5
82.7	37.5	23.0
84.4	53.3	28.4
85.6	60.5	31.5
91.1	78.5	41.7
93.4	84.0	47.3
95.6	87.6	52.6
101.2	92.9	66.5
103.6	95.6	73.8
106.7	97.7	83.6
107.5	98.2	85.4

== Spectral data ==
UV-Vis
λ_{max}
? nm
Extinction coefficient, ε
?
IR
Major absorption bands

(liquid film)
Wave number	transmittance
3675 cm^{−1}	79%
3544 cm^{−1}	81%
3202 cm^{−1}	77%
3164 cm^{−1}	60%
3003 cm^{−1}	52%
2944 cm^{−1}	52%
2629 cm^{−1}	81%
2410 cm^{−1}	81%
2293 cm^{−1}	44%
2254 cm^{−1}	4%
1445 cm^{−1}	30%
1378 cm^{−1}	25%
1181 cm^{−1}	84%
1040 cm^{−1}	43%
918 cm^{−1}	47%
750 cm^{−1}	70%

NMR
Proton NMR

Carbon-13 NMR

Other NMR data

MS
Masses of
main fragments
