= Cyanuric fluoride =

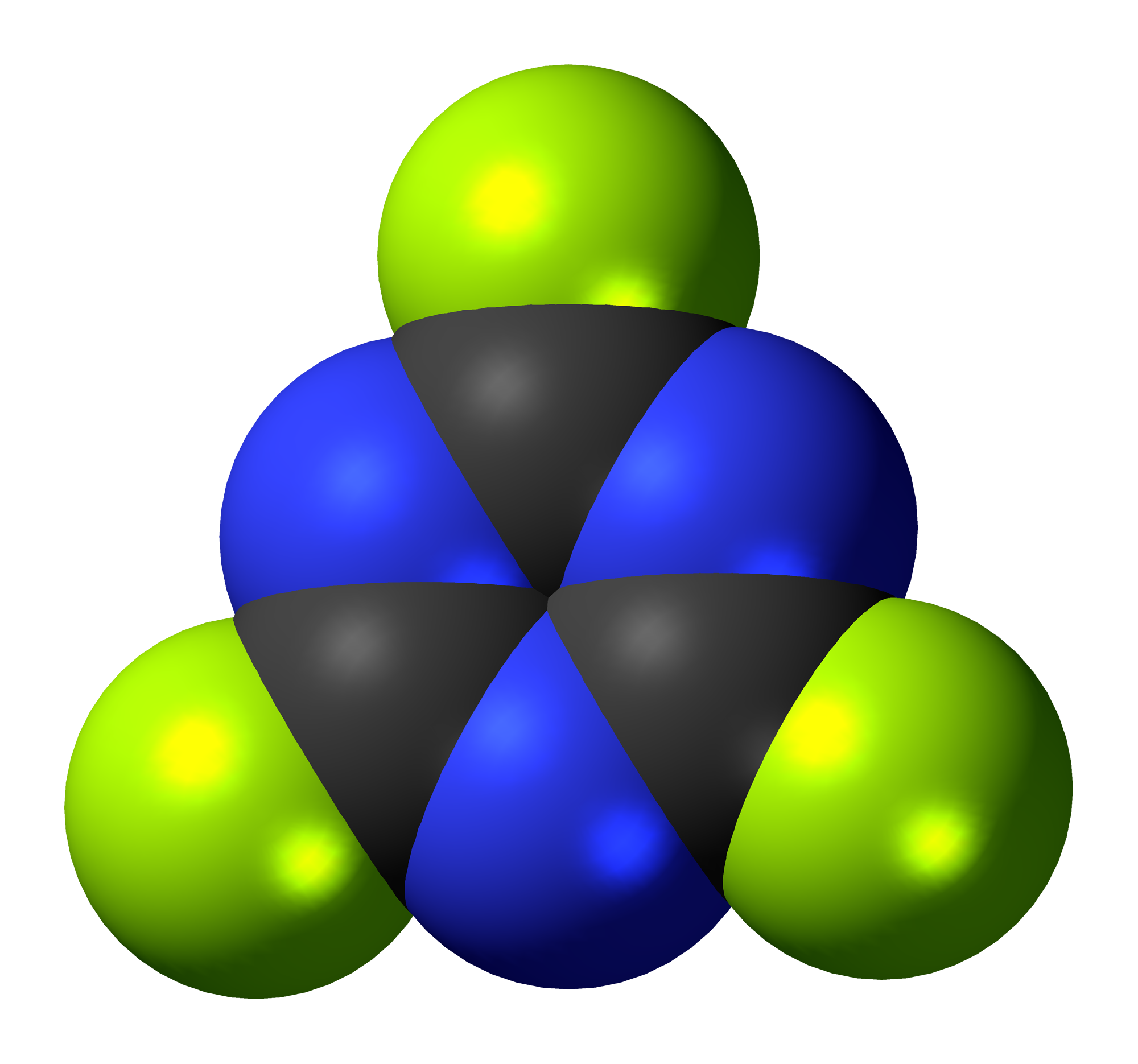

Names
- IUPAC name 2,4,6-trifluoro-1,3,5-triazine
- Other names trifluorotriazine, 2,4,6-trifluoro-s-triazine, cyanuryl fluoride embox

Identifiers
CAS Number	675-14-9
3D model (JSmol)	Interactive image
ChemSpider	12143
ECHA InfoCard	100.010.565
EC Number	211-620-8
PubChem CID	12664
UNII	31KW4S5FBB
UN number	3389 1935
CompTox Dashboard (EPA)	DTXSID6060975
- InChI: InChI=1S/C3F3N3/c4-1-7-2(5)9-3(6)8-1 Key: VMKJWLXVLHBJNK-UHFFFAOYSA-N; InChI=1/C3F3N3/c4-1-7-2(5)9-3(6)8-1 Key: VMKJWLXVLHBJNK-UHFFFAOYAH
- SMILES: Fc1nc(F)nc(F)n1

Properties
Chemical formula	C_{3}F_{3}N_{3}
Molar mass	135.047 g/mol
Appearance	colourless liquid
Density	1.574 g/cm^{3}
Melting point	−38 °C (−36 °F; 235 K)
Boiling point	74 °C (165 °F; 347 K)

Hazards
- GHS labelling
Pictograms	(GHS05: Corrosive) (GHS06: Toxic)
Signal word	Danger
Hazard statements	H310, H314, H330
Precautionary statements	P260, P262, P264, P270, P271, P280, P284, P301+P330+P331, P302+P350, P303+P361+P353, P304+P340, P305+P351+P338, P310, P320, P321, P361, P363, P403+P233, P405, P501

Related compounds
Related compounds	cyanuric acid, cyanuric chloride, cyanuric bromide
- Except where otherwise noted, data are given for materials in their standard state (at 25 °C [77 °F], 100 kPa). verify (what is ?) Infobox references

Cyanuric fluoride or 2,4,6-trifluoro-1,3,5-triazine is a chemical compound with the formula (CNF)_{3}. It is a colourless, pungent liquid. It has been used as a precursor for fibre-reactive dyes, as a specific reagent for tyrosine residues in enzymes, and as a fluorinating agent.

It is classified as an extremely hazardous substance in the United States as defined in Section 302 of the U.S. Emergency Planning and Community Right-to-Know Act (42 U.S.C. 11002), and is subject to strict reporting requirements by facilities which produce, store, or use it in significant quantities.

== Preparation and reactions ==
Cyanuric fluoride is prepared by fluorinating cyanuric chloride. The fluorinating agent may be SbF_{3}Cl_{2}, KSO_{2}F, or NaF.

Cyanuric fluoride is used for the mild and direct conversion of carboxylic acids to acyl fluorides:

Other fluorinating methods are less direct and may be incompatible with some functional groups.

Cyanuric fluoride hydrolyses easily to cyanuric acid and it reacts more readily with nucleophiles than cyanuric chloride. Pyrolysis of cyanuric fluoride at 1300 °C is a way to prepare cyanogen fluoride:

(CNF)_{3} → 3 CNF.
