= Cyanogen chloride =

- Skeletal formula of cyanogen chloride

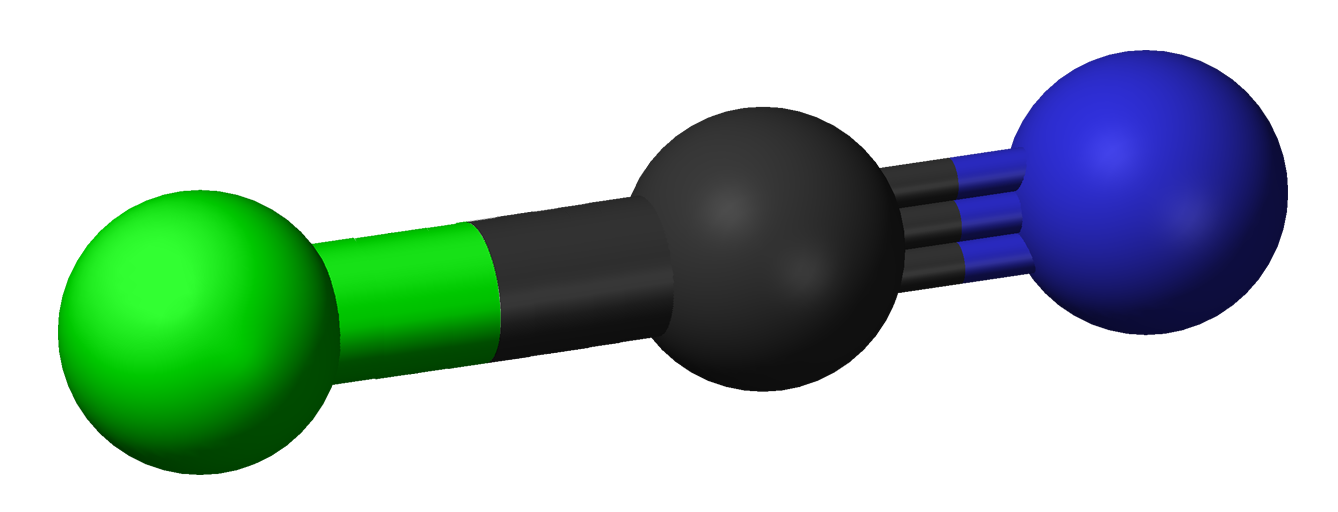
Ball and stick model of cyanogen chloride
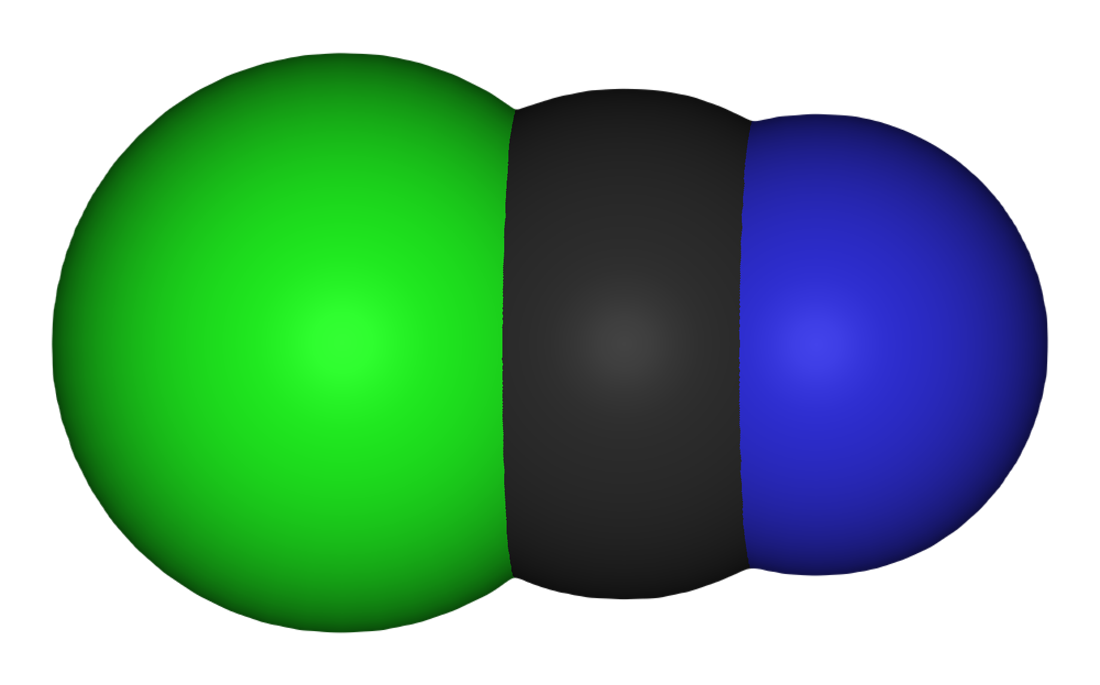
Spacefill model of cyanogen chloride

Names
- Preferred IUPAC name Carbononitridic chloride
- Systematic IUPAC name Chloroformonitrile
- Other names: Chlorine cyanide; Cyanic chloride; Chlorocyanogen; Chlorcyan; Chlorocyanide; CK

Identifiers
CAS Number	506-77-4
3D model (JSmol)	Interactive image
Abbreviations	CK
ChemSpider	10045
ECHA InfoCard	100.007.321
EC Number	208-052-8
MeSH	cyanogen+chloride
PubChem CID	10477
RTECS number	GT2275000
UNII	697I61NSA0
UN number	1589
CompTox Dashboard (EPA)	DTXSID4021551
- InChI: InChI=1S/CClN/c2-1-3 Key: QPJDMGCKMHUXFD-UHFFFAOYSA-N
- SMILES: ClC#N

Properties
Chemical formula	ClCN
Molar mass	61.470 g/mol
Appearance	Colorless gas
Odor	acrid
Density	2.7683 mg/cm^{3} (at 0 °C, 101.325 kPa)
Melting point	−6.55 °C (20.21 °F; 266.60 K)
Boiling point	13 °C (55 °F; 286 K)
Solubility in water	soluble
Solubility	soluble in ethanol, ether
Vapor pressure	1.987 MPa (at 21.1 °C)
Magnetic susceptibility (χ)	−32.4·10^{−6} cm^{3}/mol

Thermochemistry
Std molar entropy (S^{⦵}_{298})	236.33 J/(mol·K)
Std enthalpy of formation (Δ_{f}H^{⦵}_{298})	137.95 kJ/mol

Hazards
- Occupational safety and health (OHS/OSH)
Main hazards	Highly toxic; forms cyanide in the body
- GHS labelling
Pictograms	(GHS05: Corrosive) (GHS06: Toxic) (GHS09: Environmental hazard)
Signal word	Danger
NFPA 704 (fire diamond)	4 0 2
Flash point	nonflammable
- NIOSH (US health exposure limits)
PEL (Permissible)	none
REL (Recommended)	C 0.3 ppm (0.6 mg/m^{3})
IDLH (Immediate danger)	N.D.
Safety data sheet (SDS)	inchem.org

Related compounds
Related alkanenitriles	Hydrogen cyanide; Thiocyanic acid; Cyanogen iodide; Cyanogen bromide; Cyanogen fluoride; Acetonitrile; Aminoacetonitrile; Glycolonitrile; Cyanogen
- Except where otherwise noted, data are given for materials in their standard state (at 25 °C [77 °F], 100 kPa). verify (what is ?) Infobox references

Cyanogen chloride is an inorganic compound with the formula ClCN. This triatomic pseudohalogen is an easily condensed colorless gas. More commonly encountered in the laboratory is the related compound cyanogen bromide, a room-temperature solid that is used in biochemical analysis and preparation. Cyanogen compounds are highly toxic.

== Synthesis, basic properties, structure ==
Cyanogen chloride is a linear molecule with the connectivity Cl−C≡N, as are HCN and the related cyanogen halides (FCN, BrCN, ICN). The carbon and chlorine atoms are linked by a single bond, and carbon and nitrogen by a triple bond. It is a linear molecule. Cyanogen chloride is produced by the oxidation of sodium cyanide with chlorine. This reaction proceeds via the intermediate cyanogen ((CN)_{2}).

NaCN + Cl_{2} → ClCN + NaCl

The compound trimerizes in the presence of acid to the heterocycle called cyanuric chloride.

Cyanogen chloride is slowly hydrolyzed by water at neutral pH to release cyanate and chloride ions:

ClCN + H_{2}O → [OCN]^{−} + Cl^{−} + 2 H^{+}

== Applications in synthesis ==
Cyanogen chloride is a precursor to the sulfonyl cyanides and chlorosulfonyl isocyanate, a useful reagent in organic synthesis.

Further chlorination gives the isocyanide dichloride.

== Safety ==
Also known as CK, cyanogen chloride is a highly toxic blood agent, and was once proposed for use in chemical warfare. It causes immediate injury upon contact with the eyes or respiratory organs. Symptoms of exposure may include drowsiness, rhinorrhea (runny nose), sore throat, coughing, confusion, nausea, vomiting, edema, loss of consciousness, convulsions, paralysis, and death. It is especially dangerous because it is capable of penetrating the filters in gas masks, according to United States analysts. CK is unstable due to polymerization, sometimes with explosive violence.

== Chemical weapon ==
Cyanogen chloride is listed in schedule 3 of the Chemical Weapons Convention: all production must be reported to the OPCW.

By 1945, the U.S. Army's Chemical Warfare Service developed chemical warfare rockets intended for the new M9 and M9A1 Bazookas. An M26 Gas Rocket was adapted to fire cyanogen chloride-filled warheads for these rocket launchers. As it was capable of penetrating the protective filter barriers in some gas masks, it was seen as an effective agent against Japanese forces (particularly those hiding in caves or bunkers) because their standard issue gas masks lacked the barriers that would provide protection against cyanogen chloride. The US added the weapon to its arsenal, and considered using it, along with hydrogen cyanide, as part of Operation Downfall, the planned invasion of Japan, but President Harry Truman decided against it, instead using the atomic bombs developed by the secret Manhattan Project. The CK rocket was never deployed or issued to combat personnel.
