= Glycolonitrile =

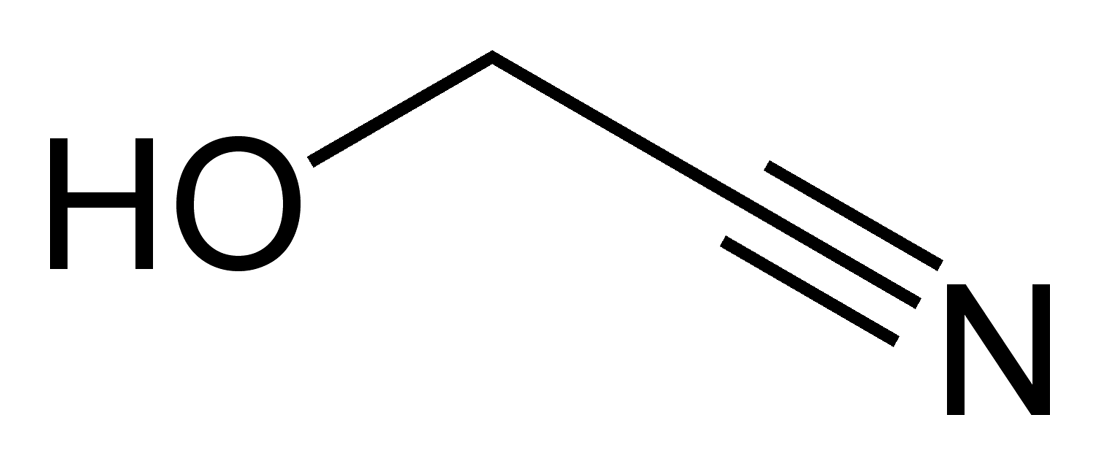
- Skeletal formula of glycolonitrile

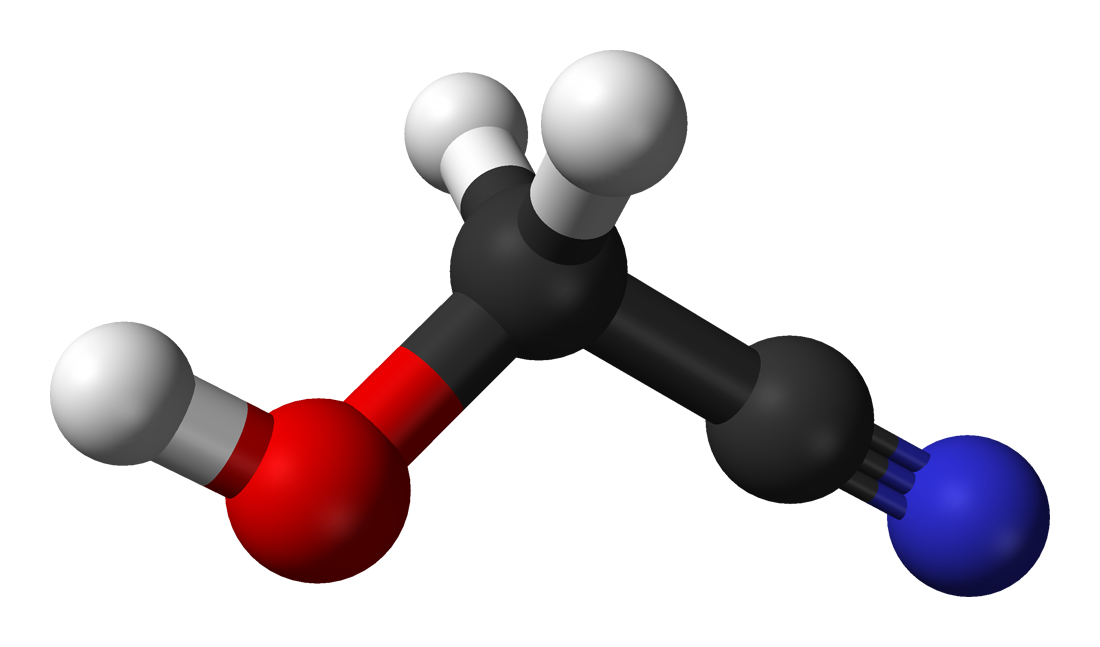
Ball and stick model of glycolonitrile
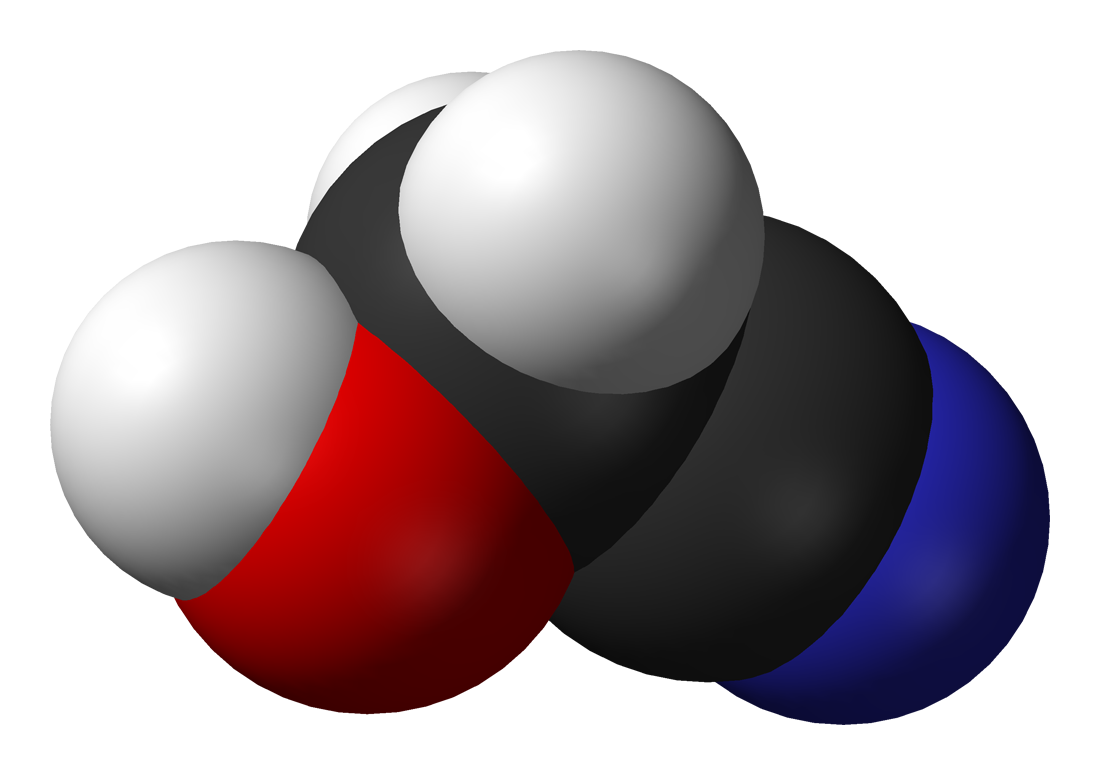
Spacefill model of glycolonitrile

Names
- Preferred IUPAC name Hydroxyacetonitrile
- Other names: Cyanomethanol; Formaldehyde cyanohydrin; Glycolic nitrile; Hydroxyacetonitrile; Hydroxyethylnitrile

Identifiers
CAS Number	107-16-4
3D model (JSmol)	Interactive image
Beilstein Reference	605328
ChEBI	CHEBI:137685
ChemSpider	7569
ECHA InfoCard	100.003.155
EC Number	203-469-1
MeSH	glycolonitrile
PubChem CID	7857
UNII	ZCI474BE63
CompTox Dashboard (EPA)	DTXSID3025417
- InChI: InChI=1S/C2H3NO/c3-1-2-4/h4H,2H2 Key: LTYRAPJYLUPLCI-UHFFFAOYSA-N
- SMILES: OCC#N

Properties
Chemical formula	C_{2}H_{3}NO
Molar mass	57.052 g·mol^{−1}
Appearance	Colourless, oily liquid
Odor	odorless
Density	1.10 g/mL (18.89°C)
Melting point	< −72 °C; −98 °F; 201 K
Boiling point	99.6 °C; 211.2 °F; 372.7 K at 2.3 kPa
Solubility in water	soluble
Vapor pressure	1 mmHg (62.78°C)

Hazards
- Occupational safety and health (OHS/OSH)
Main hazards	forms cyanide in the body
- NIOSH (US health exposure limits)
PEL (Permissible)	none
REL (Recommended)	C 2 ppm (5 mg/m^{3}) [15-minute]
IDLH (Immediate danger)	N.D.

Related compounds
Related alkanenitriles	Hydrogen cyanide; Thiocyanic acid; Cyanogen iodide; Cyanogen bromide; Cyanogen chloride; Cyanogen fluoride; Acetonitrile; Aminoacetonitrile; Cyanogen; Propanenitrile; Aminopropionitrile; Malononitrile; Pivalonitrile; Acetone cyanohydrin
Related compounds	DBNPA
- Except where otherwise noted, data are given for materials in their standard state (at 25 °C [77 °F], 100 kPa). verify (what is ?) Infobox references

Glycolonitrile, also called hydroxyacetonitrile or formaldehyde cyanohydrin, is the organic compound with the structure HOCH_{2}CN. It is the simplest cyanohydrin, being derived from formaldehyde. It is a colourless liquid that dissolves in water and ether, and is useful in production of several industrially important chemicals. Because glycolonitrile decomposes readily into formaldehyde and hydrogen cyanide, it is listed as an extremely hazardous substance. In January 2019, astronomers reported the detection of glycolonitrile, another possible building block of life among other such molecules, in outer space.

== Synthesis and reactions ==
Glycolonitrile is produced by combining formaldehyde with hydrogen cyanide at near-neutral pH. The reaction is catalyzed by base. Glycolonitrile polymerizes under alkaline conditions.

Glycolonitrile can react with ammonia to give aminoacetonitrile, which can be hydrolyzed to give glycine. The general process for reaction of an aldehyde, hydrogen cyanide, and ammonia, followed by hydrolysis, to give an amino acid is the industrially important Strecker amino acid synthesis:

HOCH_{2}CN + NH_{3} → H_{2}NCH_{2}CN + H_{2}O
H_{2}NCH_{2}CN + 2 H_{2}O → H_{2}NCH_{2}CO_{2}H + NH_{3}

Ethylenediaminetetraacetic acid widely used as a chelating agent, can be prepared from glycolonitrile and ethylenediamine followed by hydrolysis of the resulting tetranitrile. Nitrilotriacetic acid is prepared similarly.

== Reactivity ==
4-Amino-2-hydroxy-2-hyroxymethyloxazolidine, the trimer of glycolonitrile

Glycolonitrile rapidly forms various dimers, trimers, and higher oligomers in alkaline solution.
