= Cyanogen bromide =

Chemical compound (BrCN)

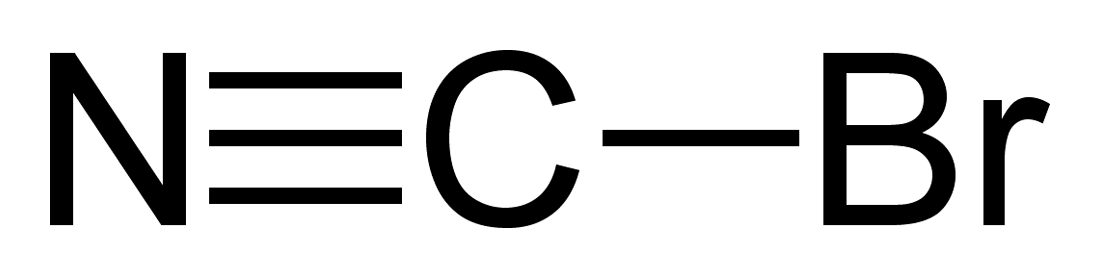
- Skeletal formula of cyanogen bromide

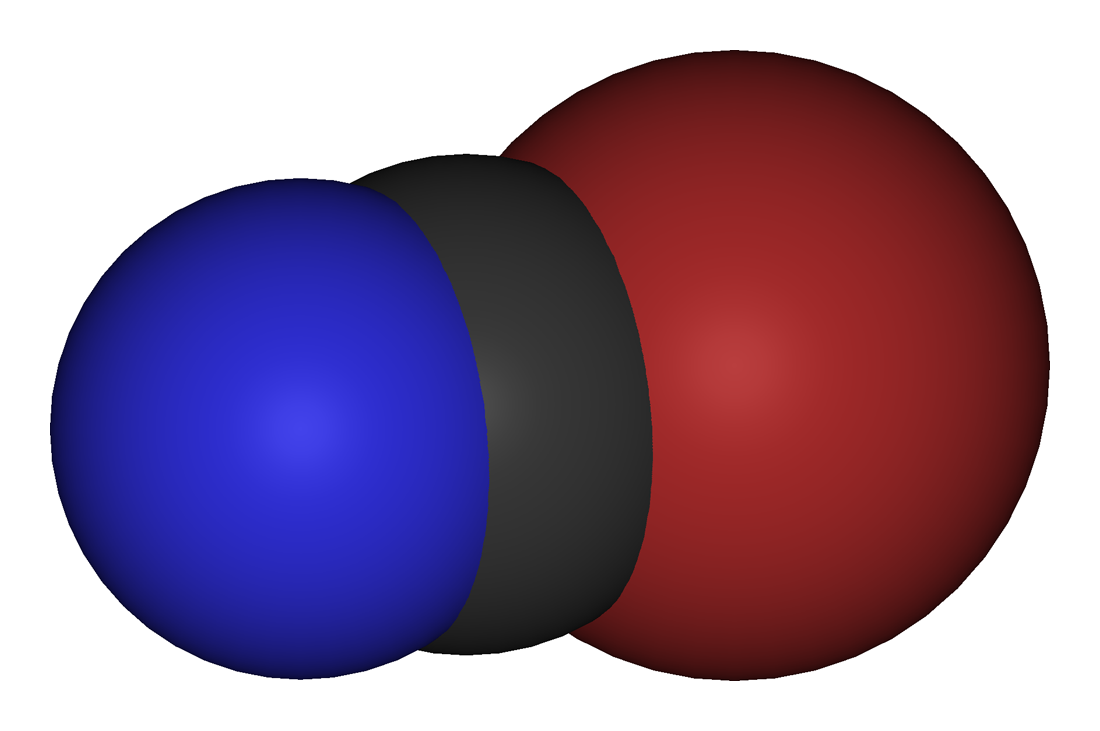
- Spacefill model of cyanogen bromide

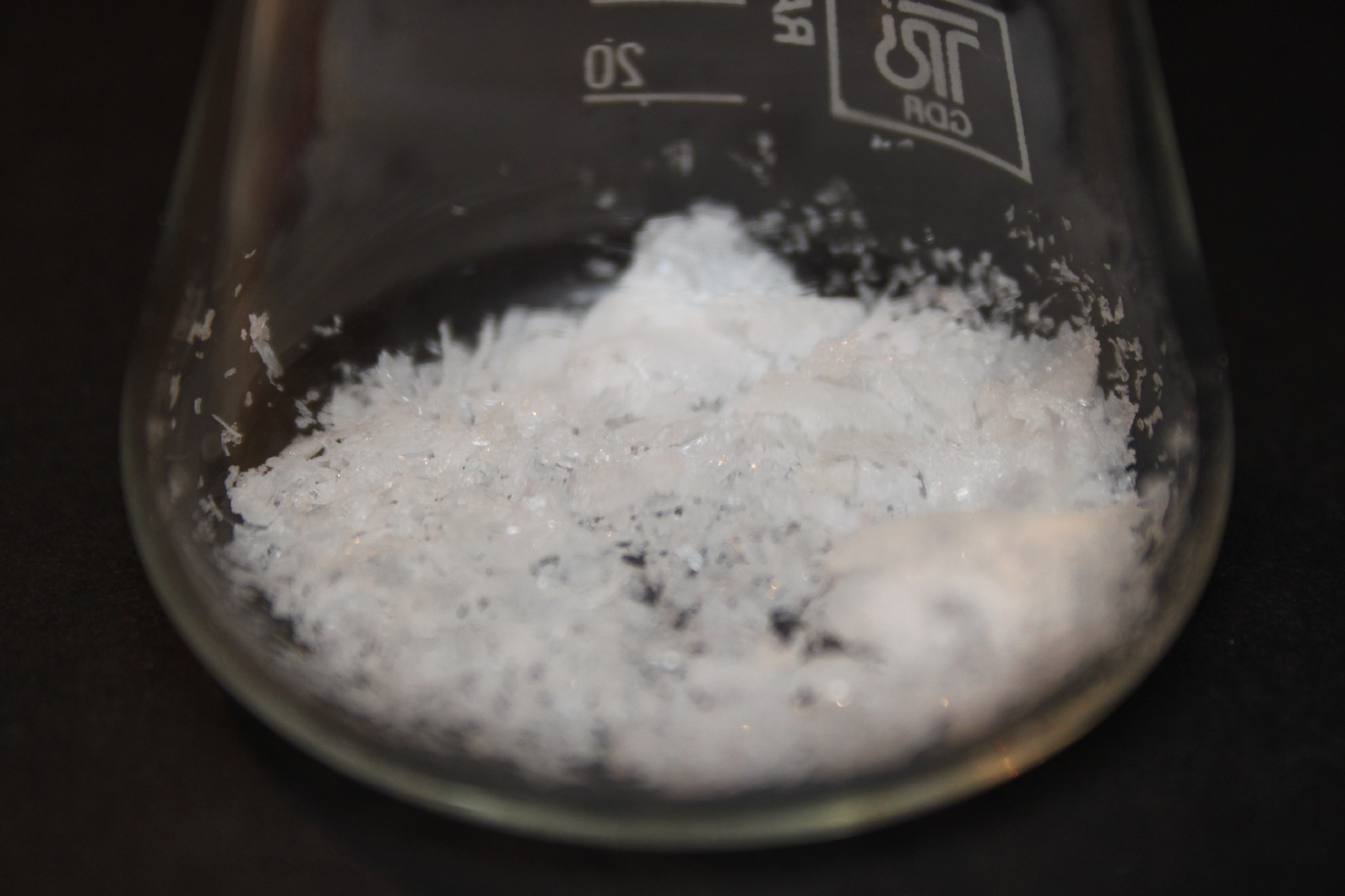

Names
- Preferred IUPAC name Carbononitridic bromide
- Other names: Bromine cyanide; Campilit

Identifiers
CAS Number	506-68-3
3D model (JSmol)	Interactive image
Beilstein Reference	1697296
ChemSpider	10044
ECHA InfoCard	100.007.320
EC Number	208-051-2
MeSH	Cyanogen+Bromide
PubChem CID	10476
RTECS number	GT2100000
UNII	OS382OHJ8P
UN number	1889
CompTox Dashboard (EPA)	DTXSID9021550
- InChI: InChI=1S/CBrN/c2-1-3 Key: ATDGTVJJHBUTRL-UHFFFAOYSA-N
- SMILES: BrC#N

Properties
Chemical formula	BrCN
Molar mass	105.922 g·mol^{−1}
Appearance	Colorless solid
Density	2.015 g/cm^{3}
Melting point	50 to 53 °C (122 to 127 °F; 323 to 326 K)
Boiling point	61 to 62 °C (142 to 144 °F; 334 to 335 K)
Solubility in water	Reacts
Vapor pressure	16.2 kPa

Thermochemistry
Std enthalpy of formation (Δ_{f}H^{⦵}_{298})	136.1–144.7 kJ/mol

Hazards
- GHS labelling
Pictograms	(GHS05: Corrosive) (GHS06: Toxic) (GHS09: Environmental hazard)
Signal word	Danger
Hazard statements	H300, H310, H314, H330, H410
Precautionary statements	P260, P273, P280, P284, P302+P350
NFPA 704 (fire diamond)	4 0 1
- NIOSH (US health exposure limits)
PEL (Permissible)	5 mg/m^{3}

Related compounds
Related alkanenitriles	Hydrogen cyanide; Thiocyanic acid; Cyanogen iodide; Cyanogen chloride; Cyanogen fluoride; Acetonitrile; Aminoacetonitrile; Glycolonitrile; Cyanogen
- Except where otherwise noted, data are given for materials in their standard state (at 25 °C [77 °F], 100 kPa). verify (what is ?) Infobox references

Cyanogen bromide is the inorganic compound with the formula BrCN. It is a colorless solid that is widely used to modify biopolymers, fragment proteins and peptides (cuts the C-terminus of methionine), and synthesize other compounds. The compound is classified as a pseudohalogen.

== Synthesis, basic properties, and structure ==
The carbon atom in cyanogen bromide is bonded to bromine by a single bond and to nitrogen by a triple bond (i.e. Br−C≡N). The compound is linear and polar, but it does not spontaneously ionize in water. It dissolves in both water and polar organic solvents.

Cyanogen bromide can be prepared by oxidation of sodium cyanide with bromine, which proceeds in two steps via the intermediate cyanogen ((CN)_{2}):

2 NaCN + Br_{2} → (CN)_{2} + 2 NaBr
(CN)_{2} + Br_{2} → 2 BrCN

When refrigerated the material has an extended shelflife. Like some other cyanogen compounds, cyanogen bromide undergoes an exothermic trimerisation to cyanuric bromide ((BrCN)_{3}). This reaction is catalyzed by traces of bromine, metal salts, acids and bases. For this reason, experimentalists avoid brownish samples.

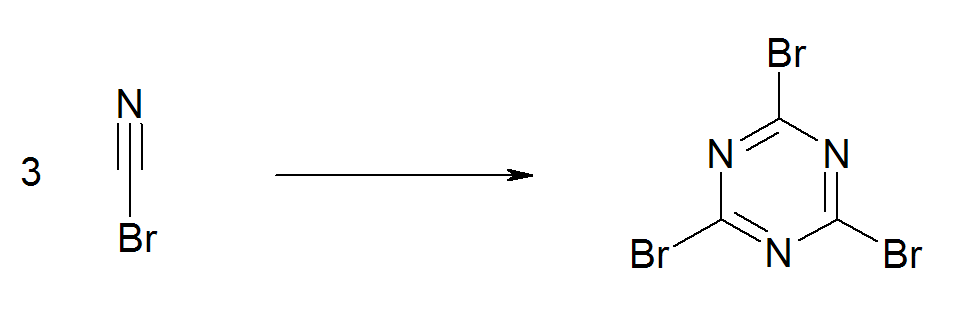

Cyanogen bromide is hydrolyzed to form isocyanic acid and hydrobromic acid:

BrCN + H_{2}O → HNCO + HBr

== Biochemical applications ==
The main uses of cyanogen bromide are to immobilize proteins, fragment proteins by cleaving peptide bonds, and synthesize cyanamides and other molecules.

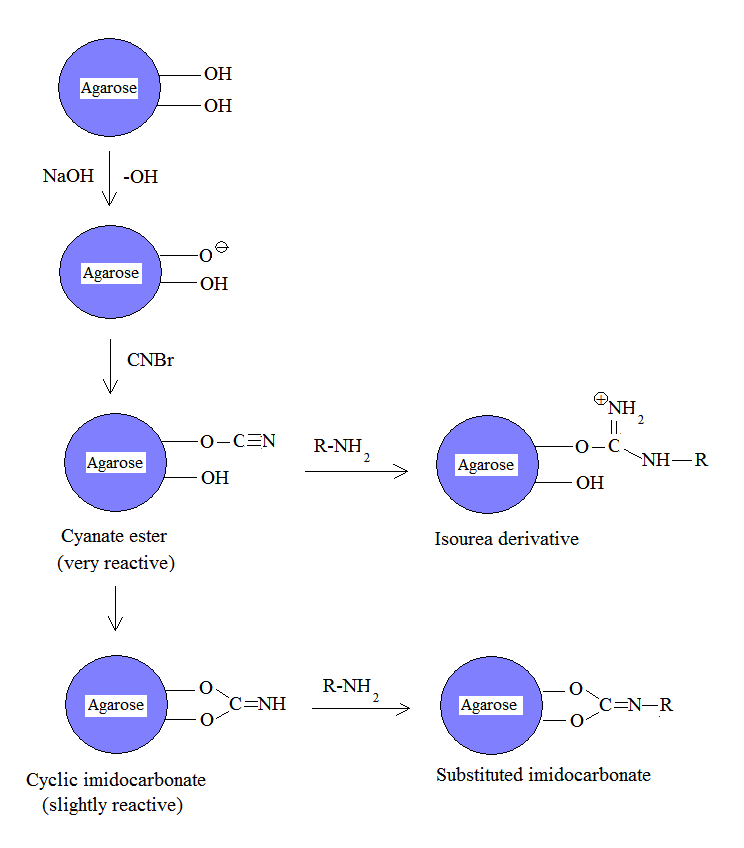
Cyanogen bromide activation method

=== Protein immobilization ===
Cyanogen bromide is often used to immobilize proteins by coupling them to reagents such as agarose for affinity chromatography. Because of its simplicity and mild pH conditions, cyanogen bromide activation is the most common method for preparing affinity gels. Cyanogen bromide is also often used because it reacts with the hydroxyl groups on agarose to form cyanate esters and imidocarbonates. These groups are reacted with primary amines in order to couple the protein onto the agarose matrix, as shown in the figure. Because cyanate esters are more reactive than are cyclic imidocarbonates, the amine will react mostly with the ester, yielding isourea derivatives, and partially with the less reactive imidocarbonate, yielding substituted imidocarbonates.

The disadvantages of this approach include the toxicity of cyanogen bromide and its sensitivity to oxidation. Also, cyanogen bromide activation involves the attachment of a ligand to agarose by an isourea bond, which is positively charged at neutral pH and thus unstable. Consequently, isourea derivatives may act as weak anion exchangers.

=== Protein cleavage ===
Cyanogen bromide hydrolyzes peptide bonds at the C-terminus of methionine residues. This reaction is used to reduce the size of polypeptide segments for identification and sequencing.

==== Mechanism ====
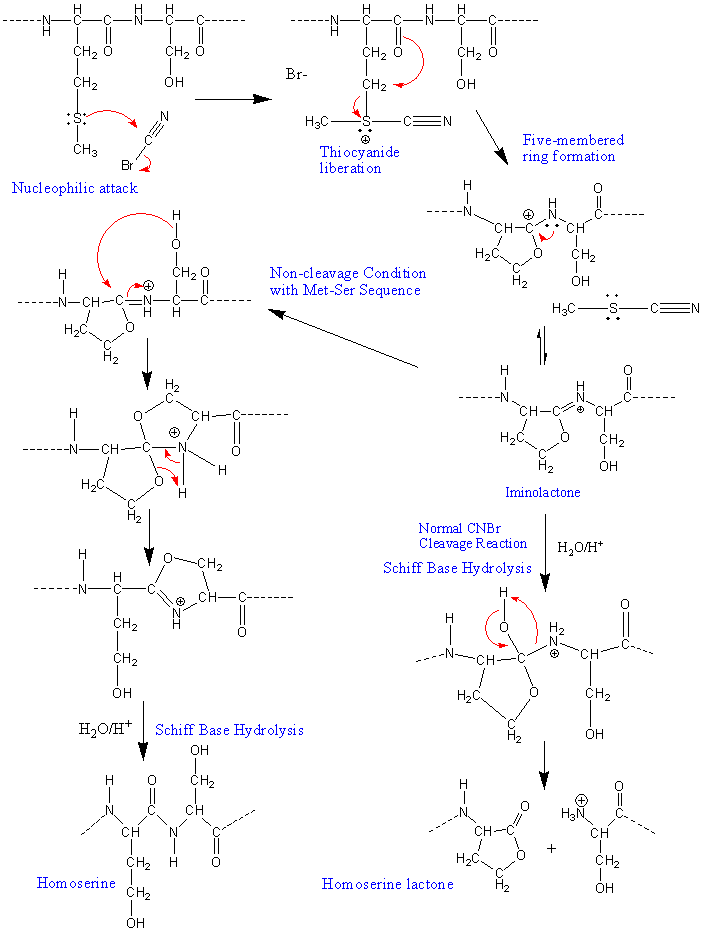
Cyanogen bromide peptide bond cleavage

The electron density in cyanogen bromide is shifted away from the carbon atom, making it unusually electrophilic, and towards the more electronegative bromine and nitrogen. This leaves the carbon particularly vulnerable to attack by a nucleophile, and the cleavage reaction begins with a substitution reaction in which bromine is ultimately replaced by the sulfur in methionine. This attack is followed by the formation of a five-membered ring as opposed to a six-membered ring, which would entail the formation of a double bond in the ring between nitrogen and carbon. This double bond would result in a rigid ring conformation, thereby destabilizing the molecule. Thus, the five-membered ring is formed so that the double bond is outside the ring, as shown in the figure.

Although the nucleophilic sulfur in methionine is responsible for attacking BrCN, the sulfur in cysteine does not behave similarly. If the sulfur in cysteine attacked cyanogen bromide, the bromide ion would deprotonate the cyanide adduct, leaving the sulfur uncharged and the beta carbon of the cysteine not electrophilic. The strongest electrophile would then be the cyanide carbon, which, if attacked by water, would yield cyanic acid and the original cysteine.

==== Reaction conditions ====
Cleaving proteins with BrCN requires using a buffer such as 0.1M HCl (hydrochloric acid) or 70% (formic acid). These are the most common buffers for cleavage. An advantage to HCl is that formic acid causes the formation of formyl esters, which complicates protein characterization. However, formic is still often used because it dissolves most proteins. Also, the oxidation of methionine to methionine sulfoxide, which is inert to BrCN attack, occurs more readily in HCl than in formic acid, possibly because formic acid is a reducing acid. Alternative buffers for cleavage include guanidine or urea in HCl because of their ability to unfold proteins, thereby making methionine more accessible to BrCN.

Water is required for normal peptide bond cleavage of the iminolactone intermediate. In formic acid, cleavage of Met-Ser and Met-Thr bonds is enhanced with increased water concentration because these conditions favor the addition of water across the imine rather than reaction of the side chain hydroxyl with the imine. Lowered pH tends to increase cleavage rates by inhibiting methionine side chain oxidation.

==== Side reactions ====
When methionine is followed by serine or threonine, side reactions can occur that destroy the methionine without peptide bond cleavage. Normally, once the iminolactone is formed (refer to figure), water and acid can react with the imine to cleave the peptide bond, forming a homoserine lactone and new C-terminal peptide. However, if the adjacent amino acid to methionine has a hydroxyl or sulfhydryl group, this group can react with the imine to form a homoserine without peptide bond cleavage. These two cases are shown in the figure.

== Organic synthesis ==
Cyanogen bromide is a common reagent in organic synthesis. In most reactions, it acts as a source of electrophilic cyanogen and nucleophilic bromide; carbocations preferentially attack the nitrogen atom. In the presence of a Lewis acid, it cyanidates arenes.

BrCN converts alcohols to cyanates; amines to cyanamides or dicyanamides. Excess BrCN continues the reaction to guanidines; hydroxylamines yield hydroxyguanidines similarly.

The cyanamides so formed umpole the original amine, and tends to eliminate alkyl substituents. In the von Braun reaction, tertiary amines react with cyanogen bromide to yield disubstituted cyanamides and an alkyl bromide. That net reaction is similar to the Polonovski elimination, but does not require N-oxidation.

In bromocyanation, BrCN adds across multiple bonds to give a vicinal cyanobromide. Bromocyanated enols spontaneously undergo a Darzens-like elimination to an epoxynitrile.

Cyanogen bromide is also a dehydrating agent, hydrolyzing to hydrogen bromide and cyanic acid.

The compound is used in the synthesis of the pharmaceuticals 4-methylaminorex and viroxime.

== Toxicity, storage, and deactivation ==
Cyanogen bromide can be stored under dry conditions at 2 to 8 °C for extended periods.

Cyanogen bromide is volatile, and readily absorbed through the skin or gastrointestinal tract. Therefore, toxic exposure may occur by inhalation, physical contact, or ingestion. It is acutely toxic, causing a variety of nonspecific symptoms. Exposure to even small amounts may cause fatal injury. LD_{50} orally in rats is reported as 25–50 mg/kg.

Cyanogen bromide was used as a chemical weapon in the World War I by Austro-Hungarian forces, either as benzene solution or mixture with 25% bromoacetone and 50% benzene.

The recommended method to deactivate cyanogen bromide is with sodium hydroxide and bleach. The aqueous alkali hydroxide instantly hydrolyzes BrCN to alkali cyanide and bromide. The cyanide can then be oxidized by sodium or calcium hypochlorite to the less toxic cyanate ion. Deactivation is extremely exothermic and may be explosive.
