= Acetonitrile =

Organic compound (CH3–C≡N); simplest organic nitrile

Skeletal formula of acetonitrile
Skeletal formula of acetonitrile with all explicit hydrogens added
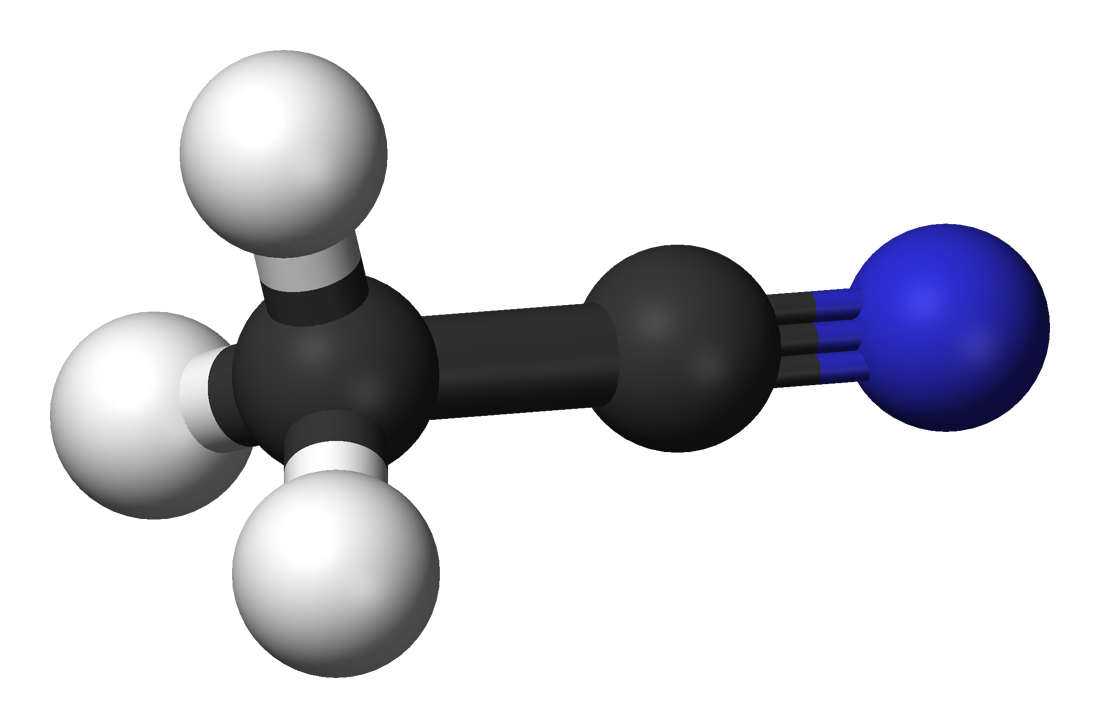
Ball and stick model of acetonitrile
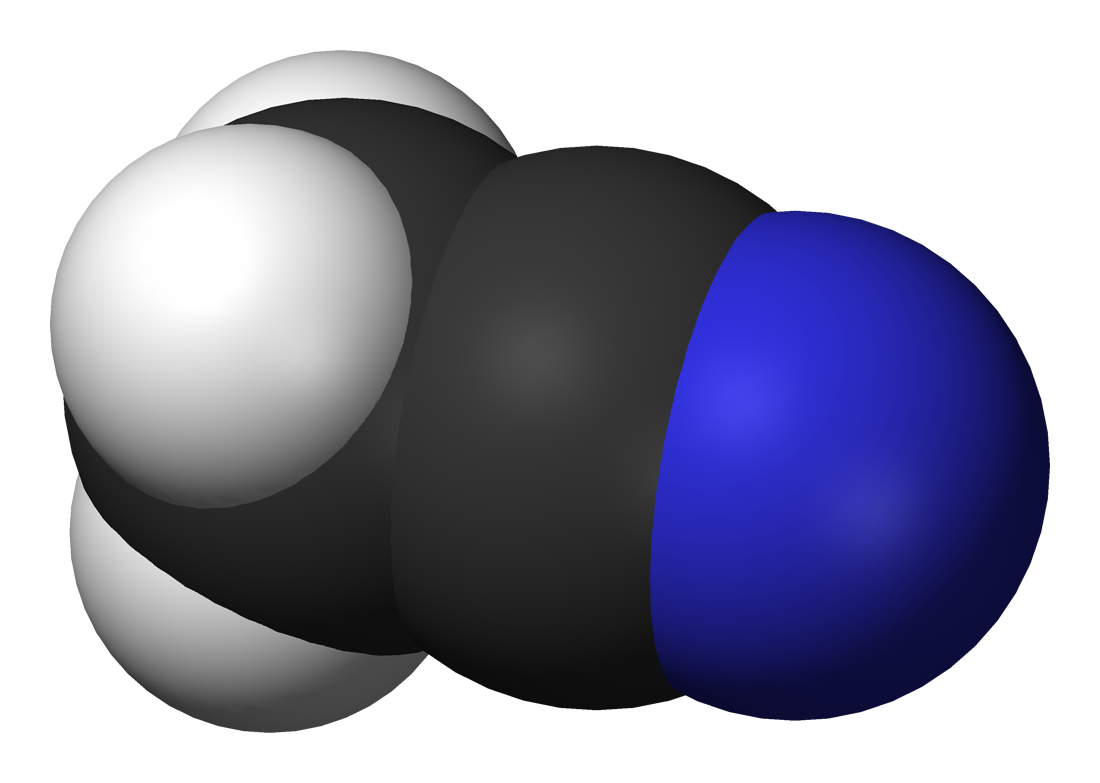
Spacefill model of acetonitrile
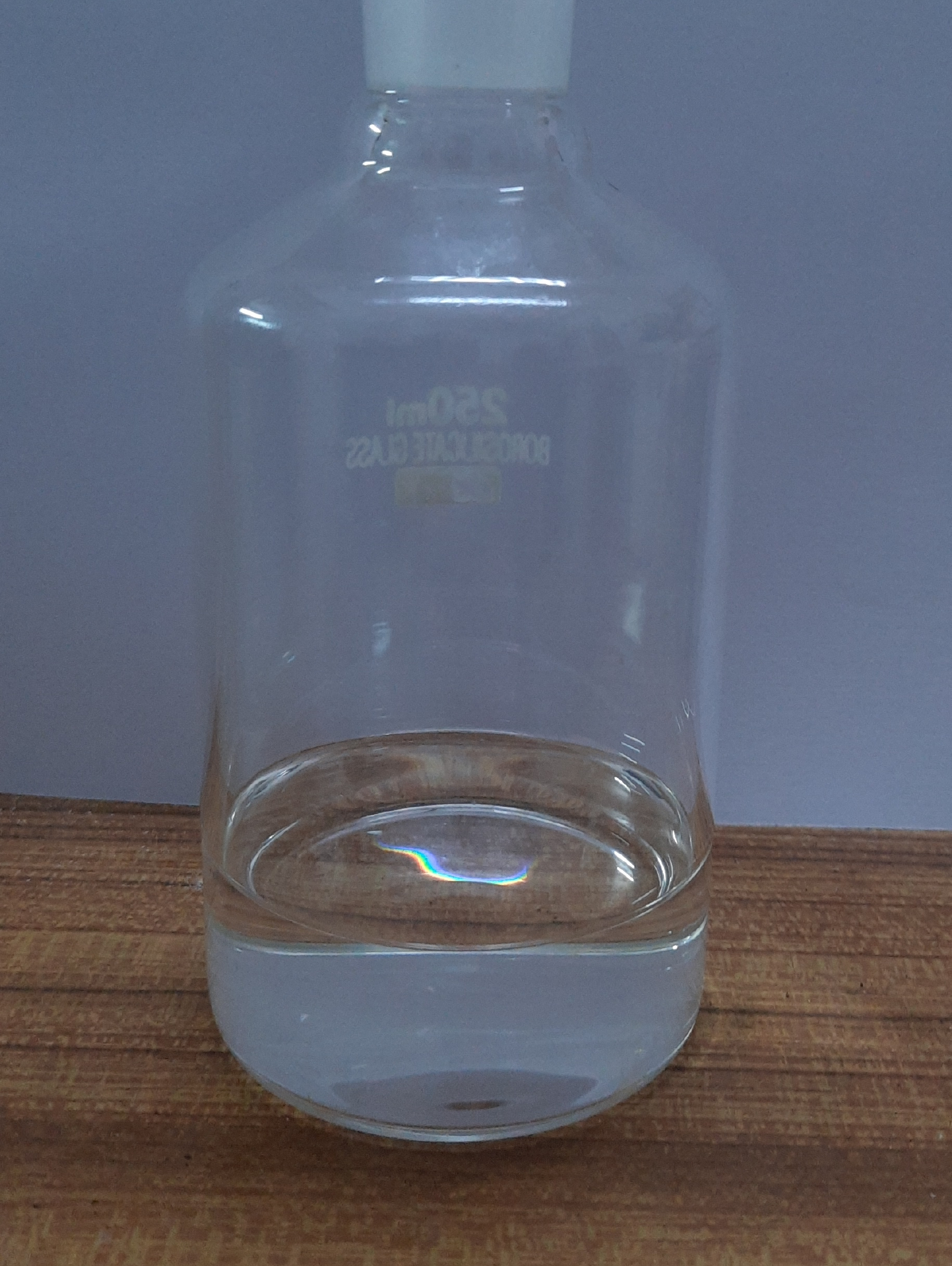

Names
- Preferred IUPAC name Acetonitrile
- Systematic IUPAC name Ethanenitrile
- Other names: Cyanomethane; Ethyl nitrile; Methanecarbonitrile; Methyl cyanide; MeCN; ACN

Identifiers
CAS Number	75-05-8
3D model (JSmol)	Interactive image
Beilstein Reference	741857
ChEBI	CHEBI:38472
ChEMBL	ChEMBL45211
ChemSpider	6102
ECHA InfoCard	100.000.760
EC Number	200-835-2
Gmelin Reference	895
MeSH	acetonitrile
PubChem CID	6342
RTECS number	AL7700000
UNII	Z072SB282N
UN number	1648
CompTox Dashboard (EPA)	DTXSID7020009
- InChI: InChI=1S/C2H3N/c1-2-3/h1H3 Key: WEVYAHXRMPXWCK-UHFFFAOYSA-N
- SMILES: CC#N

Properties
Chemical formula	C_{2}H_{3}N
Molar mass	41.053 g·mol^{−1}
Appearance	Colorless liquid
Odor	ether-like (threshold 39.8 ppm)
Density	0.786 g/cm^{3}
Melting point	−46 to −44 °C; −51 to −47 °F; 227 to 229 K
Boiling point	81.3 to 82.1 °C; 178.2 to 179.7 °F; 354.4 to 355.2 K
Critical point (T, P)	545 K (272 °C), 4.87 MPa
Solubility in water	Miscible
log P	−0.54
Vapor pressure	9.71 kPa (at 20 °C (68 °F; 293 K))
Henry's law constant (k_{H})	530 μmol/(Pa·kg)
Acidity (pK_{a})	25
UV-vis (λ_{max})	195 nm
Absorbance	≤ 0.10
Magnetic susceptibility (χ)	−28.0×10^{−6} cm^{3}/mol
Refractive index (n_{D})	1.344
Viscosity	0.350 mPa·s (20 °C (68 °F; 293 K))
Dipole moment	3.92 D

Thermochemistry
Heat capacity (C)	91.69 J⋅K^{−1}·mol^{-1}
Std molar entropy (S^{⦵}_{298})	149.62 J⋅K^{−1}·mol^{-1}
Std enthalpy of formation (Δ_{f}H^{⦵}_{298})	40.16 to 40.96 kJ⋅mol^{−1}
Std enthalpy of combustion (Δ_{c}H^{⦵}_{298})	−1256.03 to −1256.63 kJ⋅mol^{−1}
Enthalpy of fusion (Δ_{f}H^{⦵}_{fus})	8.167 kJ⋅mol^{−1} (crystalline to liquid)
Enthalpy of vaporization (Δ_{f}H_{vap})	33.225 kJ⋅mol^{−1} (25 °C (77 °F; 298 K)); 29.75 kJ⋅mol^{−1} (81.6 °C (178.9 °F; 354.8 K))

Hazards
- GHS labelling
Pictograms	(GHS02: Flammable) (GHS07: Exclamation mark)
Signal word	Danger
Hazard statements	H225, H302+H312+H332, H319
Precautionary statements	P210, P233, P240, P241, P242, P243, P261, P264, P270, P271, P280, P301+P312+P330, P303+P361+P353, P304+P340+P312, P305+P351+P338, P337+P313, P370+P378, P403+P235, P501
NFPA 704 (fire diamond)	2 3 0
Flash point	2.0 °C (35.6 °F; 275.1 K)
Autoignition temperature	523.0 °C (973.4 °F; 796.1 K)
Explosive limits	4.4%–16.0%
- Lethal dose or concentration (LD, LC)
LD_{50} (median dose)	2 g/kg (dermal, rabbit); 2.46 g/kg (oral, rat); 617 mg/kg (oral, mouse)
LC_{50} (median concentration)	5655 ppm (guinea pig, 4 hr); 2828 ppm (rabbit, 4 hr); 53,000 ppm (rat, 30 min); 7500 ppm (rat, 8 hr); 2693 ppm (mouse, 1 hr); 6.022 mg/L (mouse, 4 hr)
LC_{Lo} (lowest published)	16,000 ppm (dog, 4 hr)
- NIOSH (US health exposure limits)
PEL (Permissible)	40 ppm (70 mg/m^{3}, TWA)
REL (Recommended)	20 ppm (34 mg/m^{3}, TWA)
IDLH (Immediate danger)	500 ppm

Related compounds
Related alkanenitriles	Hydrogen cyanide; Cyanogen; Cyanogen fluoride; Cyanogen chloride; Cyanogen bromide; Cyanogen iodide; Thiocyanic acid; Aminoacetonitrile; Glycolonitrile; Propionitrile; Malononitrile; Pivalonitrile; Acetone cyanohydrin

Supplementary data page
- Acetonitrile (data page)
- Except where otherwise noted, data are given for materials in their standard state (at 25 °C [77 °F], 100 kPa). verify (what is ?) Infobox references

Acetonitrile, often abbreviated MeCN (methyl cyanide), is the chemical compound with the formula CH_{3}CN and structure H_{3}C−C≡N. This colourless liquid is the simplest organic nitrile (hydrogen cyanide is a simpler nitrile, but the cyanide anion is not classed as organic). It is produced mainly as a byproduct of acrylonitrile manufacture. It is used as a polar aprotic solvent in organic synthesis and in the purification of butadiene. The N≡C−C skeleton is linear with a short C≡N distance of 1.16 Å.

Acetonitrile was first prepared in 1847 by the French chemist Jean-Baptiste Dumas.

== Applications ==
Acetonitrile is used mainly as a solvent in the purification of butadiene in refineries. Specifically, acetonitrile is fed into the top of a distillation column filled with hydrocarbons including butadiene, and as the acetonitrile falls down through the column, it absorbs the butadiene which is then sent from the bottom of the tower to a second separating tower. Heat is then employed in the separating tower to separate the butadiene.

In the laboratory, it is used as a medium-polarity non-protic solvent that is miscible with water and a range of organic solvents, but not saturated hydrocarbons. It has a convenient range of temperatures at which it is a liquid, and dissolves a wide range of ionic and nonpolar compounds and is useful as a mobile phase in HPLC and LC–MS.

It is widely used in battery applications because of its relatively high dielectric constant and ability to dissolve electrolytes. For similar reasons, it is a popular solvent in cyclic voltammetry.

Its ultraviolet transparency UV cutoff, low viscosity and low chemical reactivity make it a popular choice for high-performance liquid chromatography (HPLC).

Acetonitrile plays a significant role as the dominant solvent used in oligonucleotide synthesis from nucleoside phosphoramidites.

Industrially, it is used as a solvent for the manufacture of pharmaceuticals and photographic film.

=== Organic synthesis ===
Acetonitrile is a common two-carbon building block in organic synthesis of many useful chemicals, including acetamidine hydrochloride, thiamine, and 1-naphthaleneacetic acid, along with more complex nitriles. Its reaction with cyanogen chloride affords malononitrile.

=== As an electron pair donor ===
Acetonitrile has a free electron pair at the nitrogen atom, which can form many transition metal nitrile complexes. For example, bis(acetonitrile)palladium dichloride is prepared by heating a suspension of palladium chloride in acetonitrile:

PdCl_{2} + 2 CH_{3}CN → PdCl_{2}(CH_{3}CN)_{2}

A related complex is tetrakis(acetonitrile)copper(I) hexafluorophosphate [Cu(CH_{3}CN)_{4}]^{+}. The CH_{3}CN ligands in these complexes are rapidly displaced.

It also forms Lewis adducts with group 13 Lewis acids like boron trifluoride. In superacids, it is possible to protonate acetonitrile.

== Production ==
Acetonitrile is a byproduct from the manufacture of acrylonitrile by catalytic ammoxidation of propylene. Most is combusted to support the intended process but an estimated several thousand tons are retained for the above-mentioned applications. Production trends for acetonitrile thus generally follow those of acrylonitrile. In 1992, 14,700 tonnes (16,200 short tons) of acetonitrile were produced in the US.

== Safety ==
=== Toxicity ===
Acetonitrile has only modest toxicity in small doses. It can be metabolised to produce hydrogen cyanide, which is the source of the observed toxic effects. Generally the onset of toxic effects is delayed, due to the time required for the body to metabolize acetonitrile to cyanide (generally about 2–12 hours).

Cases of acetonitrile poisoning in humans are rare but not unknown by inhalation and ingestion. The symptoms, which do not usually appear for several hours after the exposure, include breathing difficulties, slow pulse rate, nausea, and vomiting. Convulsions and coma can occur in serious cases, followed by death from respiratory failure. The treatment is as for cyanide poisoning, with oxygen, sodium nitrite, and sodium thiosulfate among the most commonly used emergency treatments.

It has been used in a formulation for removal of sculptured fingernails. At least two cases have been reported of accidental poisoning of young children by acetonitrile-based sculptured nail remover, one of which was fatal. Acetone and ethyl acetate are often preferred as safer for domestic use, and acetonitrile has been banned in cosmetic products in the European Economic Area since March 2000.

==== Metabolism and excretion ====
Compound	Cyanide, concentration in brain (μg/kg)	Oral LD_{50} (mg/kg)
Potassium cyanide	700±200	10
Propionitrile	510±80	40
Butyronitrile	400±100	50
Malononitrile	600±200	60
Acrylonitrile	400±100	90
Acetonitrile	28±5	2460
Table salt (NaCl)	—N/a	3000
Ionic cyanide concentrations measured in the brains of Sprague-Dawley rats one hour after oral administration of an LD_{50} of various nitriles.

In common with other nitriles, acetonitrile can be metabolised in microsomes, especially in the liver, to produce hydrogen cyanide, as was first shown by Pozzani et al. in 1959. The first step in this pathway is the oxidation of acetonitrile to glycolonitrile by an NADPH-dependent cytochrome P450 monooxygenase. The glycolonitrile then undergoes a spontaneous decomposition to give hydrogen cyanide and formaldehyde. Formaldehyde, a toxin and a carcinogen on its own, is further oxidized to formic acid, which is another source of toxicity.

The metabolism of acetonitrile is much slower than that of other nitriles, which accounts for its relatively low toxicity. Hence, one hour after administration of a potentially lethal dose, the concentration of cyanide in the rat brain was 1/20 that for a propionitrile dose 60 times lower (see table).

The relatively slow metabolism of acetonitrile to hydrogen cyanide allows more of the cyanide produced to be detoxified within the body to thiocyanate (the rhodanese pathway). It also allows more acetonitrile to be excreted unchanged before it is metabolised. The main pathways of excretion are by exhalation and in the urine.

== See also ==
- Trichloroacetonitrile – a derivative of acetonitrile used as a protecting group for hydroxyls, and also used as a reagent in the Overman rearrangement.
