= Aminoacetonitrile =

Skeletal formula of aminoacetonitrile with an implicit carbon shown
Stereo, skeletal formula of aminoacetonitrile with all implicit carbons shown, and all explicit hydrogens added
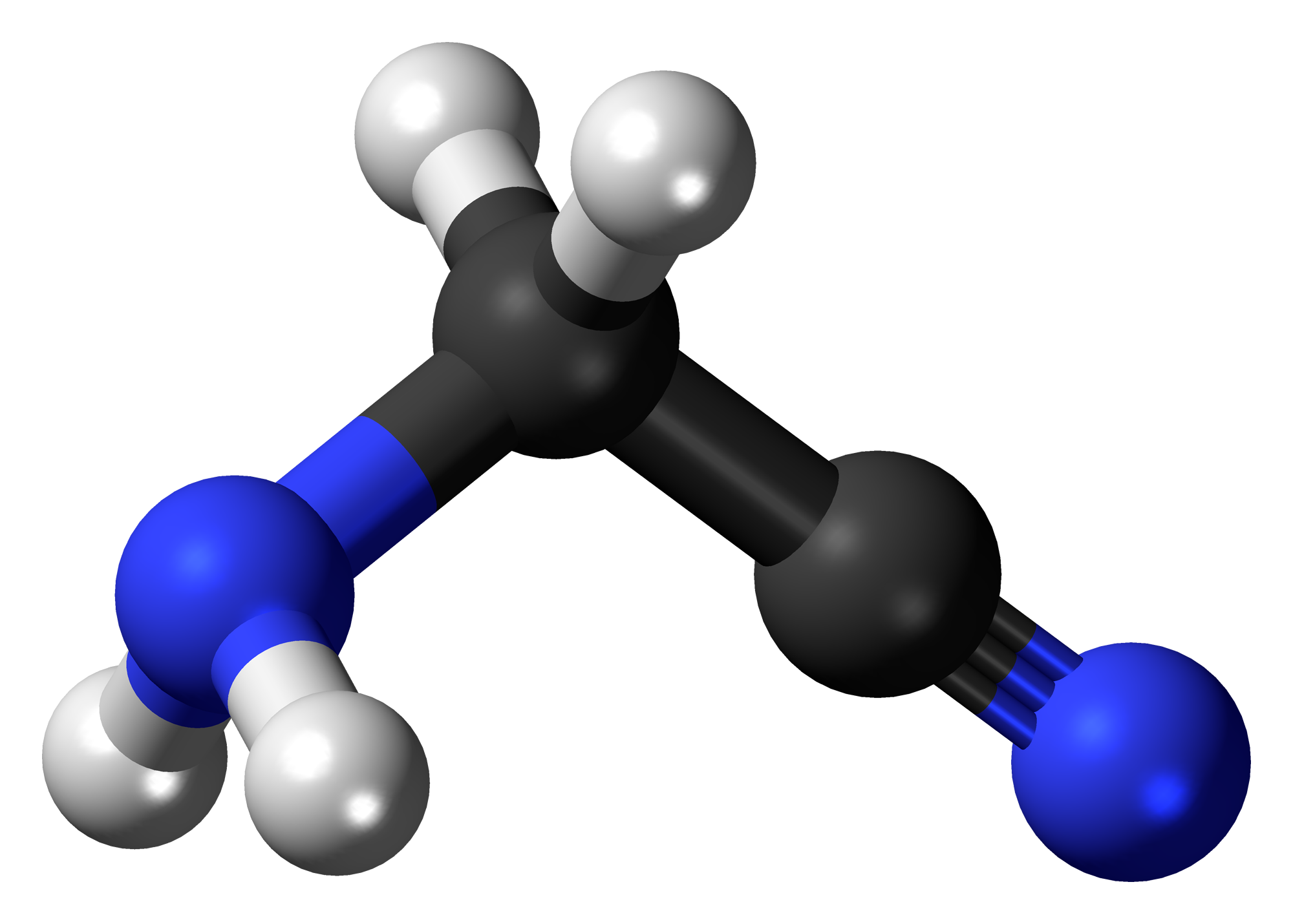
Ball and stick model of aminoacetonitrile
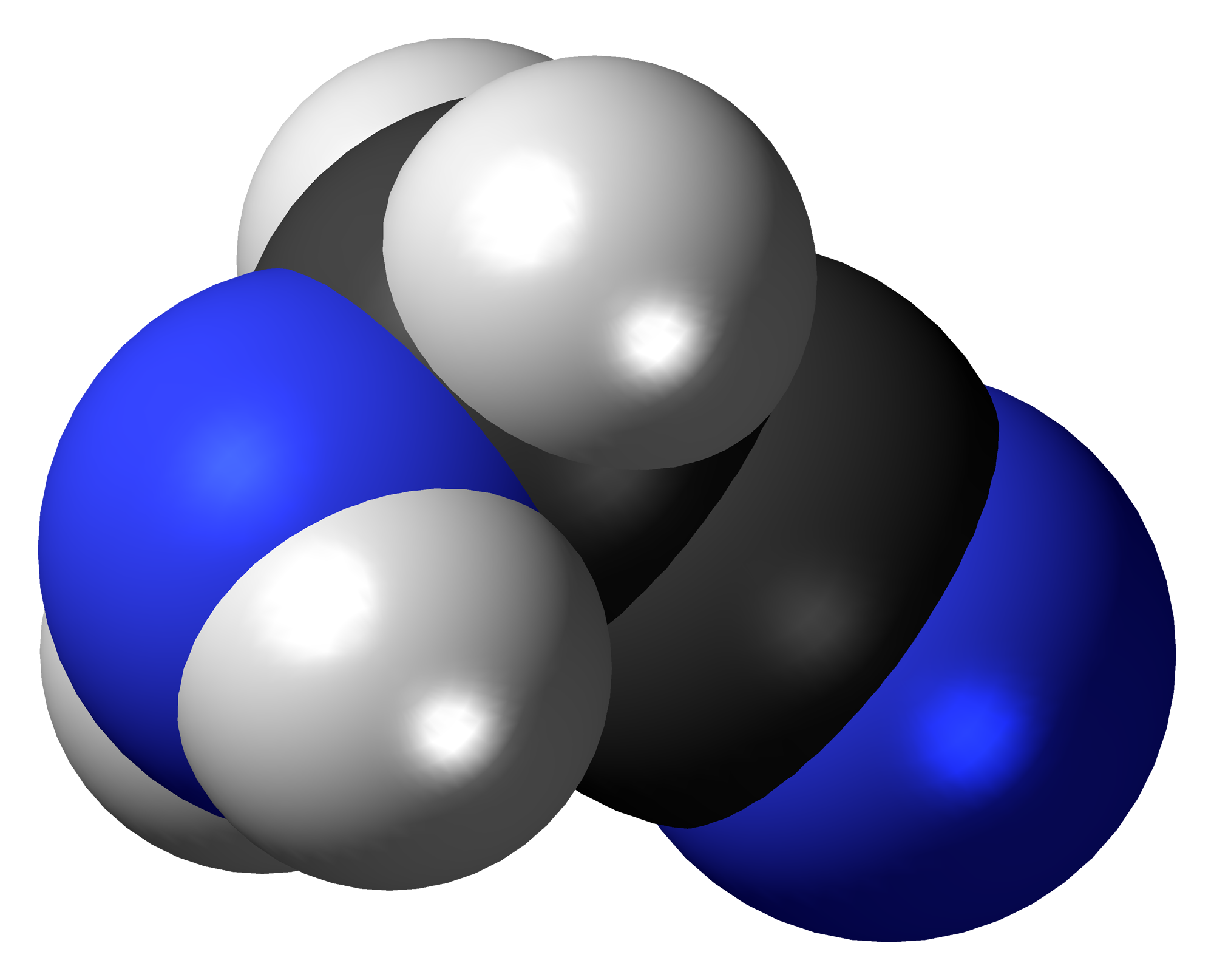
Spacefill model of aminoacetonitrile

Names
- Preferred IUPAC name Aminoacetonitrile
- Other names: Glycinonitrile; 2-Aminoacetonitrile

Identifiers
CAS Number	540-61-4
3D model (JSmol)	Interactive image
ChemSpider	10439
ECHA InfoCard	100.007.957
EC Number	208-751-8
MeSH	Aminoacetonitrile
PubChem CID	10901
RTECS number	AL7750000
UNII	3739OQ10IJ
CompTox Dashboard (EPA)	DTXSID90202314
- InChI: InChI=1S/C2H4N2/c3-1-2-4/h1,3H2 Key: DFNYGALUNNFWKJ-UHFFFAOYSA-N
- SMILES: NCC#N

Properties
Chemical formula	NH_{2}CH_{2}CN
Molar mass	56.068 g·mol^{−1}
Appearance	Colourless liquid
Boiling point	15 °C (59 °F; 288 K) at 15 mm/Hg
Acidity (pK_{a})	5.34 (conjugate acid; H_{2}O)

Hazards
- GHS labelling
Pictograms	(GHS07: Exclamation mark) (GHS08: Health hazard)
Signal word	Warning
Hazard statements	H302, H312, H332, H351
Precautionary statements	P280

Related compounds
Related alkanenitriles	Acetonitrile; Cyanogen; Aminopropionitrile
Related compounds	DBNPA
- Except where otherwise noted, data are given for materials in their standard state (at 25 °C [77 °F], 100 kPa). verify (what is ?) Infobox references

Aminoacetonitrile is the organic compound with the formula H_{2}N−CH_{2}−C≡N. The compound is a colorless liquid. It is unstable at room temperature, owing to the incompatibility of the amine nucleophile and the nitrile electrophile. For this reason it is usually encountered as the chloride and bisulfate salts of the ammonium derivative, i.e., [NCCH_{2}NH_{3}]^{+}Cl^{−} and [NCCH_{2}NH_{3}]^{+}HSO_{4}^{−}.

== Production and applications ==
Industrially aminoacetonitrile is produced from glycolonitrile by reaction with ammonia:

HOCH_{2}CN + NH_{3} → H_{2}NCH_{2}CN + H_{2}O

The aminoacetonitrile can be hydrolysed to give glycine: Being bifunctional, it is useful in the synthesis of diverse nitrogen-containing heterocycles.

Aminoacetonitrile derivatives are useful antihelmintics. They act as nematode specific ACh agonists causing a spastic paralysis and rapid expulsion from the host.

== Occurrence in the interstellar medium ==
Using radio astronomy, aminoacetonitrile was discovered in the Large Molecule Heimat, a giant gas cloud near the Galactic Center in the constellation Sagittarius. This discovery is significant to the debate on whether glycine exists widely in the universe.
