= Tomato production in Florida =

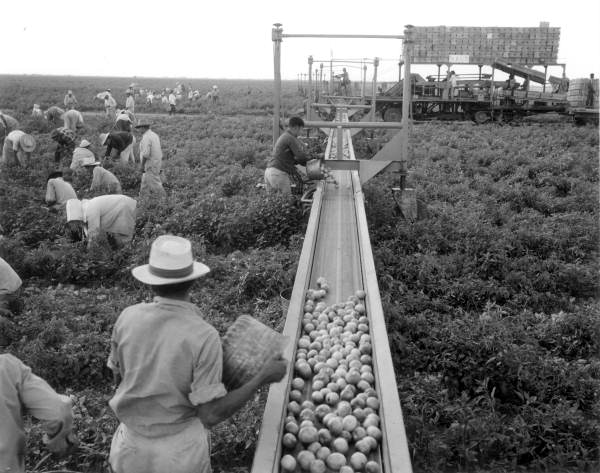
Tomato picking in Princeton, Florida in 1957

Florida is the largest producer of fresh-market tomatoes in the United States.

== Season ==
Harvest is almost year-round, from October to June. The highest temperatures of the summer from July to September end profitable yield and even the heat of June and October limit productivity, such that April to May and November to January are the largest harvests of the year. Federal Crop Insurance for fresh tomatoes specifically excludes insects and diseases.

== Diseases ==
Tomato Bacterial Spot is caused by Xanthomonas axonopodis pv. vesicatoria. Tomato Bacterial Speck is produced by Pseudomonas syringae pv. tomato. Both are economically significant in fresh-market tomato here.

=== Treatments ===
Acibenzolar-S-methyl (ASM) is a plant activator producing systemic acquired resistance (SAR). In an experiment Louws et al., 2001 used ASM to protect fresh tomato cultivation here against Tomato Bacterial Spot and Tomato Bacterial Speck. Over four years they treated with ASM as an alternative to copper bactericide and achieved almost total control with no yield loss. (Some fungicides were required to complement the bacterial control of ASM.) This result is regarded worldwide when discussing basic plant biology, SAR, induced systemic resistance, the biology of Xanthomonads, and the need for alternative pesticides due to resistance, including phage therapy in agriculture.

== Labor ==
The Florida tomato industry has historically relied on migrant labor. Exploitation of that labor was widespread with the town of Immokalee, Florida being "known as ground zero for modern day slavery."

== See also ==
- Agriculture in Florida
- Arredondo, Florida
- Felda, Florida
- Celebrity tomato
- Mango production in Florida
- Coalition of Immokalee Workers
- History of slavery in Florida
