= C6H4N2S =

The molecular formula C_{6}H_{4}N_{2}S may refer to:

- 1,2,3-Benzothiadiazole, a benzene ring that is fused to a 1,2,3-thiadiazole
- 2,1,3-Benzothiadiazole, a benzene ring that is fused to a 1,2,5-thiadiazole
