= Benzothiadiazole =

Benzothiadiazole may refer to:

- Acibenzolar-S-methyl
- 1,2,3-Benzothiadiazole
- 2,1,3-Benzothiadiazole
