= Human trafficking in Florida =

Human trafficking in Florida is the illegal trade of human beings for sexual exploitation or forced labor as it occurs in the state of Florida. After California and New York, Florida has the most human trafficking cases in the United States. Florida has had cases of sex trafficking, domestic servitude, and forced labor. A report from 2024 suggests 700,000 people were victims of human trafficking in Florida, approximately 3% of the Florida population.

Florida has a large agricultural economy and a large immigrant population, which has made it a prime environment for forced labor, particularly in the tomato industry. Also Florida's tourism industry has also helped make the state a prime target for human traffickers. Concerted efforts have led to the freeing of thousands of slaves in recent years. The National Human Trafficking Resource Center reported receiving 1,518 calls and emails in 2015 about human trafficking in Florida.

== Anti-trafficking laws and policies ==
The United States Congress passed the Victims of Trafficking and Violence Protection Act in 2000, which not only criminalizes human trafficking but aims to support its victims. In 2002, the Florida Department of Children and Families Office of Refugee Resettlement began a project to explore how Florida could implement this new law.

=== Statewide Council on Human Trafficking ===
The Florida Legislature started the Statewide Council on Human Trafficking, which will spend two years developing policy recommendations for curbing human trafficking by prosecuting offenders and providing services to victims. The council includes fifteen members, including prosecutors, legislators, health experts, social services experts, and former Attorney General Pam Bondi as Chair.

The council will work toward creating recommendations for certifying safe homes for victims of human trafficking and for prosecuting traffickers who participate in the recruitment, transportation, transfer, harboring, or receipt of persons through coercion.

== Florida farmworkers ==
Federal Civil Rights officials have prosecuted five slavery operations involving over 1,000 workers in Florida's fields since 1997. In November 2002, Ramiro Ramos, his brother Juan, and their cousin Jose Luis, sub-contractors of a farm in Immokalee, Florida, were charged ten—twelve years each for holding migrant workers in involuntary servitude. The human trafficking ring was uncovered by the Coalition of Immokalee Workers, a local organization that focuses on human rights of the Mexican and Central American immigrants in the region who are exploited for cheap or unpaid labor.

== Cases ==
From 2015 to 2017, Bladimir Moreno, owner of Los Villatoros Harvesting LLC, ran a racketeering-style forced-labor scheme using H-2A agricultural visas, across several U.S. states, including Florida, Kentucky, Indiana, Georgia, and North Carolina. He charged inflated recruitment fees, confiscated passports, imposed debt burdens, housed workers in crowded unsanitary conditions, and threatened them with deportation if they refused. In 2022 he pleaded guilty to RICO and forced-labor conspiracy, and was sentenced to 118 months in federal prison, plus over US$175,000 restitution.

== See also ==
- History of slavery in Florida
