= BTH =

BTH may refer to:

- Bachelor of Theology (B.Th.)
- Bacterial two-hybrid system, a genetic technique to detect interactions among proteins
- Benzothiadiazole (disambiguation)
- Blekinge Institute of Technology (Blekinge Tekniska Högskola), Sweden
- British Thomson-Houston, a British engineering and heavy industrial company
- British Transport Hotels
- California Business, Transportation and Housing Agency, US
- Hang Nadim International Airport, Batam, Indonesia (IATA: BTH)
- Bone Thugs-n-Harmony, American hip hop group
- IOC sport code for biathlon at the Winter Olympics
