= Hurd–Mori 1,2,3-thiadiazole synthesis =

Name reaction in organic chemistry

Named after	Charles D. Hurd; Raymond I. Mori
Reaction type	Ring forming reaction

The Hurd–Mori 1,2,3-thiadiazole synthesis is a name reaction in organic chemistry that allows for the generation of 1,2,3-thiadiazoles through the reaction of hydrazone derivatives with an N-acyl or N-tosyl group reacted with thionyl chloride. An analogous reaction gives 1,2,3-selenadiazoles by using selenium dioxide instead of thionyl chloride.
