= Celebrity tomato =

Tomato cultivar

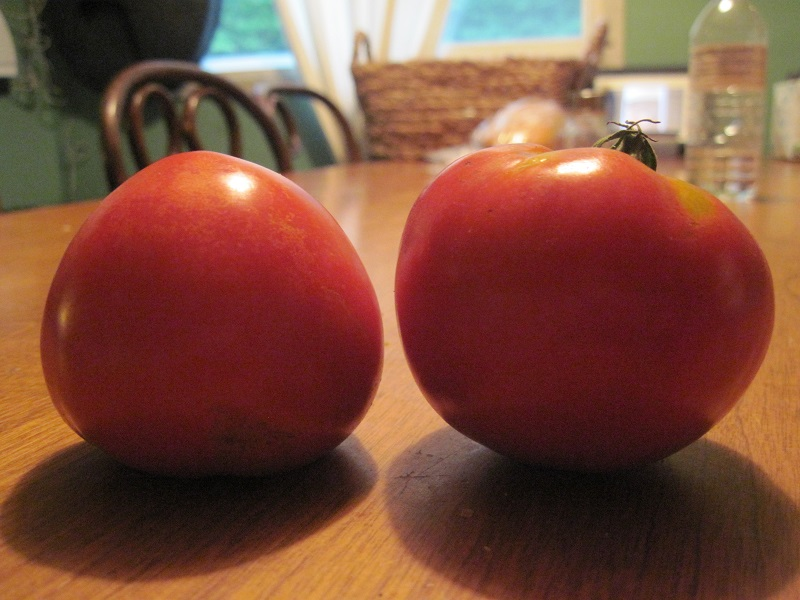
- Ripe Celebrity tomato

Tomato (Solanum lycopersicum)
- Maturity: 70-75 days
- Plant height: 5-10 feet
- Fruit weight: 8-10 oz
- Leaf: Regular leaf
- Resist.: verticillium wilt (V), fusarium wilt 1 and 2 (F), nematodes, and tobacco mosaic virus (T)
- Color: Red
- Shape: Globe

The Celebrity tomato cultivar is a hybrid (biology) that produces long fruit-bearing stems holding 20 or more very plump, robust tomatoes. Fruits weigh approximately 8 oz., and are 4 inches across. Plants need caging or staking, and produce fruit throughout the growing season. The celebrity tomato is a cultivar of the species Solanum lycopersicum. It is a crossbreed of the common tomato that is widely used for various culinary purposes. This tomato is of great size and is known to be resistant to most tomato diseases such as Fusarium wilt, Verticillium wilt, Tobacco mosaic virus and Root-knot nematode due to its hybrid nature. Celebrity tomatoes are highly adaptive to harsh environments and can grow in a wide range of places including dry, humid and wet regions. They are resistant to cracking and splitting which usually occurs when there is an excess of water and sugar movement in the fruits. Therefore, causing the tomato skin to grow at a slower rate compared to the expansion of the fruit. They can survive in harsh uneven rainfall. However, they are highly susceptible to colder environments and are at a higher risk of dying in regions with short growing seasons. The plants can grow up to 5 feet in height with bright red medium-sized fruits. The plants are generally very thick and grow in clusters. The tomato fruits are mostly used in the making of various salsas, salads, juices and canned food.

== History ==
The hybridization (biology) of tomato cultivars was introduced in 1945 to provide gardeners, chefs and food industries with high quality, disease resistant and flavorful tomatoes. The hybrid plant Celebrity tomato was first produced in USA by Colen Wyatt who was a vegetable breeder in the late 20th century. The plant was commercially distributed in the late 1980s for PetoSeed Co. which is now a subsidiary of Seminis Vegetable Seeds. In 1984, the plant was judged by various experts in the fields of horticulture and recognized as a recipient of the All-America Selections award due to its favorable characteristics compared to other tomato cultivars. This tomato cultivar remains a popular choice for gardeners and is often winners of several gardening and horticulture research experiments for its distinct features.

== Botany ==
=== Description ===
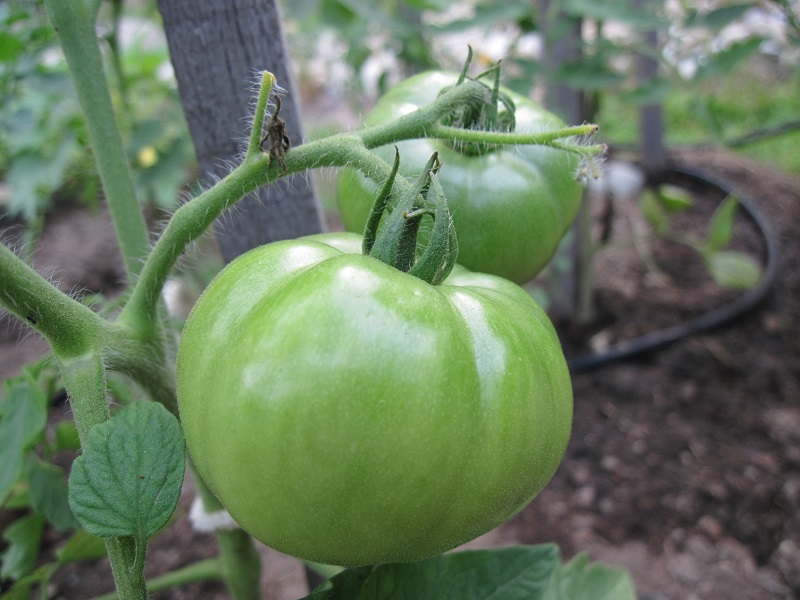
Unripe celebrity tomato

Celebrity tomato plants are semi-determinate and grow in bush-like formation with compound Regular Leaves (RL) and stems ranging from 5-10 feet in height. Due to having traits of a determinate cultivar, the plant stops growing after reaching a certain height and further growth is prevented through the production of flowers in groups. In some cases, the plant will continue growing and bear fruit despite reaching its pre-determined height and therefore is labelled as a semi-determinate.

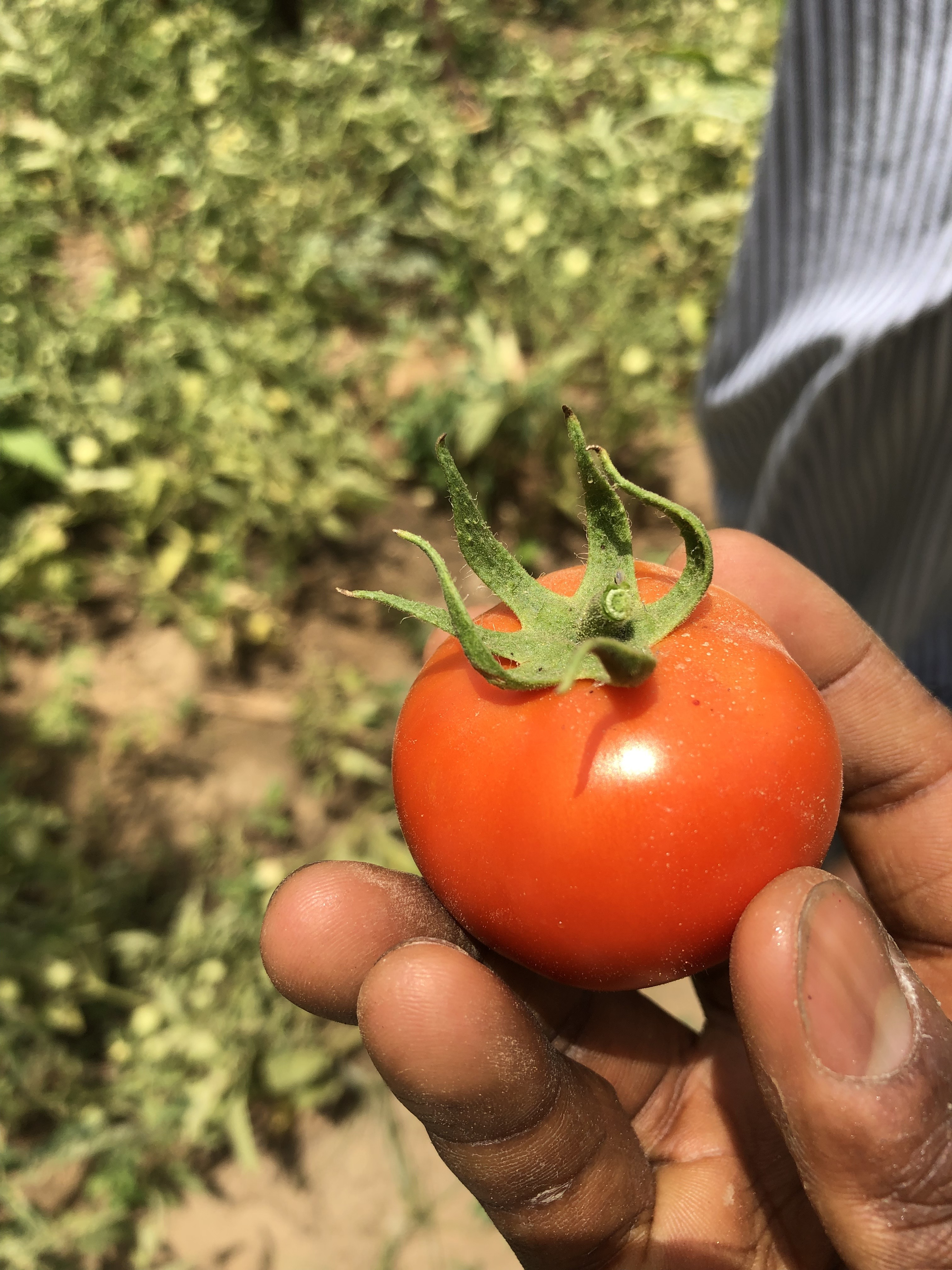
A ripped tomato held in hand.

The flowers are yellow in color and bloom size is less than 1 inch. The maturity time of the plant ranges from 70 to 75 days since it is a mid-season variety. The tomatoes are medium in size weighing 8-10 oz each and ripens in less than 6 weeks. The exterior and interior of the fruit is bright red in color with a distinct flattened-globe shape. The only edible parts of the plant include the fruits since the leaves and roots are toxic upon consumption. The life cycle of Celebrity tomatoes is perennial as it does not require replanting every year and will survive for a long period of time.

=== F1 Hybrid Breeding ===
Celebrity tomato is a first generation (F1) hybrid. It was designed through the interbreeding of two pure tomato plants with desired characteristics such as disease resistance, high yields and good flavor. This was achieved by crossing inbred parent plants that were either pollen-carrying or seed-carrying.

== Cultivation ==
=== Growing Conditions ===
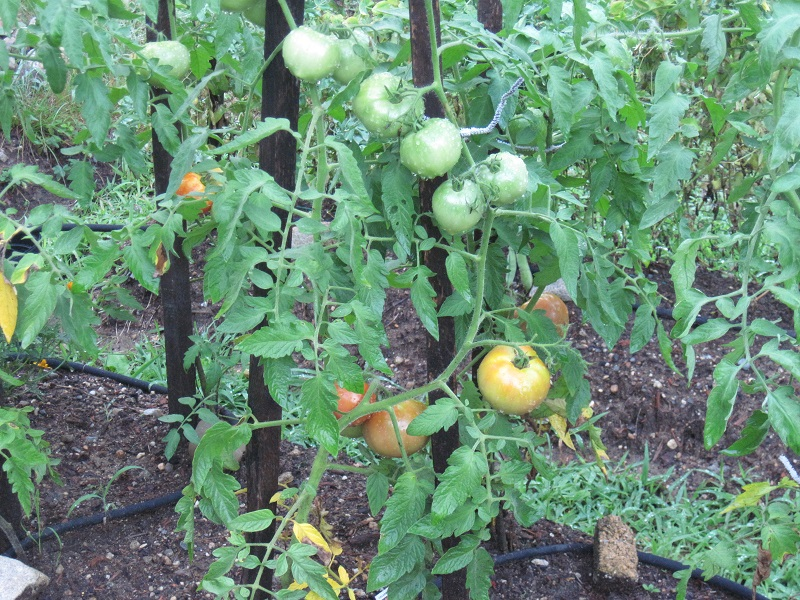
Celebrity plants in their early stages

Celebrity tomato plant requires full sun to grow and reach its potential height, bear fruits and achieve maximum yields. Although Celebrity tomatoes can be grown in a wide range of soils it is recommended to plant them in tightly packed and nutrient-rich soils. Seeds are typically sown 6-8 weeks before the last frost date. Seed germination usually occurs between 6-10 days. High yields of this plant are achieved by maintaining an appropriate soil pH level of 6.2-6.8. Application of Fertilizer is recommended to the soil when the plant begins flowering. The plant requires a consistent and large amount of water throughout the season. Moisture needs to reach at least 6 inches deep into the soil to promote root and plant growth. Soil moisture can be carefully retained through the use of mulch. By using fabrics such as black landscaping fabric, it can cause the soil to become warm more quickly and aid in an earlier plantation of seeds. Mulching can also improve the soil productivity and reduce the amount of weeds that can interfere with the growth of Celebrity tomatoes. Without sufficient moisture the plant can have stunted growth and blossom end rot. Minimizing pests and maximizing water retention are essential to cultivating the Celebrity tomato, and this is achieved through the application of mulch in its surrounding.

The plants require proper spacing (2 feet) between each plant to ensure that diseases do not spread. Staking is a necessary method that is required by the tomato plants since it can grow up to 10 feet tall and the fruits can become quite heavy and large in size.

It is recommended that Celebrity tomatoes should be rotated away from other members of the Solanaceae family for a period of three years. Since Celebrity tomatoes require a high amount of nitrogen, potassium and phosphorus in the soil to thrive, planting beans and peas beforehand will improve the soil conditions by fixing more nitrogen into the soil. Crop rotation of Celebrity tomatoes enables a disease-free, weed-free environment for the plants and decreases the number of pests that are present due to the successful competition of weeds with the accompanying crops. This also ensures that the soil does not wear out from the plants’ nutrient demands, which can lead to a reduction of agricultural productivity, poor soil structure and degradation of soil quality.

== Consumption ==
=== Nutrition ===
Celebrity tomatoes
Nutritional value per 100 g (3.5 oz)
- Energy: 74 kJ (18 kcal)
- Carbohydrates: 3.9 g
- Sugars: 2.6 g
- Dietary fiber: 1.2 g
- Fat: 0.2 g
- Protein: 0.9 g
Vitamins and minerals
Vitamins	Quantity %DV^{†}
Vitamin A equiv. beta-Carotene lutein zeaxanthin	5% 42 μg 4% 449 μg 123 μg
Thiamine (B1)	3% 0.037 mg
Niacin (B3)	4% 0.594 mg
Vitamin B6	5% 0.08 mg
Vitamin C	16% 14 mg
Vitamin E	4% 0.54 mg
Vitamin K	7% 7.9 μg
Minerals	Quantity %DV^{†}
Magnesium	3% 11 mg
Manganese	5% 0.114 mg
Phosphorus	2% 24 mg
Potassium	8% 237 mg
- Other constituents: Quantity
- Water: 94.5 g
- Lycopene: 2573 µg
- Link to USDA Database entry
- ^{†}Percentages estimated using US recommendations for adults, except for potassium, which is estimated based on expert recommendation from the National Academies.

According to the United States Department of Agriculture (USDA) Celebrity tomatoes have very low calories containing 18 calories per 100g (3.5 oz). There are no saturated, monounsaturated and polyunsaturated fats and the total percentage of fats is 0%. They provide a good source of dietary fibers, vitamins and minerals that are essential for health and well-being. Since the tomatoes contain Lycopene which is an antioxidant phytochemical, it helps prevent the formation of free radicals that can develop cancer.

=== Culinary ===
Celebrity tomatoes are usually eaten sliced or raw in sandwiches and salsas. They are used to make thick sauces for pasta and noodles, tomato stocks, tomato soups and salads. They can also be cooked and added to dishes such as tomato purèe and tomato fritters which greatly enhance their flavour due to the tangy taste of tomatoes. In some cases, Celebrity tomatoes are also used as a garnish for savory dishes. Other dishes such as stuffed tomatoes, tomato basil bruschetta, broiled tomatoes and cheese, spaghetti squash with tomatoes incorporate Celebrity tomatoes.

Green or unripe tomatoes are used to prepare various chutneys and can also be pickled. They are usually used to make canned tomatoes and are fried to form components of other dishes.

=== Storage ===
After harvesting ripe Celebrity tomatoes, they should be kept at room temperature for a maximum of 2-3 days in order to ensure that the taste is best and fresh. Celebrity tomatoes should not be refrigerated straight away since they are sensitive to cold temperatures. Even though refrigerating them will keep the Celebrity tomatoes from ripening faster, it will eventually lead to a distorted taste and make them lose their original flavor. They are to be stored away from direct sunlight since this can cause quicker spoiling of tomatoes. The stems are to be removed from the tomatoes carefully and they should be stored in an ‘upside-down’ manner.

In the case of harvesting unripe Celebrity tomatoes, the ripening process can be appropriately quickened by placing them in a paper bag containing apples or bananas. This is because fruits such as apples and bananas exude Ethylene gas that can make the ripening process of tomatoes faster.

Celebrity tomatoes can last for up to a week when stored properly however it depends on the ripeness of the tomatoes when harvested. Consumption of ripe tomatoes should be done within 1-2 days since this enables maximum absorption of vitamins and minerals present in the fruits. It is recommended that the tomatoes should be preserved rather than refrigerated to maintain their original texture and flavor.

== Diseases and Pests ==
Celebrity tomatoes are resistant to Verticillium Wilt, a fungal disease which causes a yellow colour to plant leaves and eventually causes the leaves to wilt and die. It is also resistant to Fusarium Wilt which is a fungus found in the soil that infects the roots of plants, stopping plant growth and causing leaf necrosis. Root-knot nematodes and tobacco mosaic virus resistance are found in celebrity tomatoes which both cause stunted growth and decreased yields.

Despite having such high resistance to fungal and viral infections, Celebrity tomatoes are not immune to other pests and diseases. Aphids are a persistent pest that negatively impact the fruits and leaves of the tomato plants. The most common aphids that affect tomato plants include potato and green-peach aphids and a large number of them cause leaf curling through the suction of sap. Cutworms and hornworms are caterpillars that cause massive damage to the essential parts of new plants by feeding on them. This causes insufficient growth of plant leaves, lateral shoots and ultimately plant death. Spider mites and scales are pests that cause punctures to the top and underside of tomato leaves in order to feed on the sap. This can cause yellowing of leaves, wilted leaves, premature fruit production and stunted plant growth.

Harm can be done to the foliage of Celebrity tomato plants by slugs and snails. This is because they chew on the leaves of plants and have a detrimental impact on low-hanging fruits. Russet mites are pests that can cause Celebrity tomato plant leaves to turn greasy in appearance before turning bronze in color. Pinworms and fruitworms are caterpillars that cause heavy damage to the plant leaves by eating them.

=== Pest Control ===
Through the removal of hiding places such as under rocks, wooden boards and areas with many weeds, the number of snails and slugs can be minimized. It is also appropriate to hand-pick snails out of your garden and to lay snail traps to ensure the growth of healthy plants. The use fungicidal and miticidal sulphur dust and wettable sulphur prevents russet mites from creating bronzing of tomato foliage.

Celebrity tomatoes should not be planted near plants from the Solanaceae family such as petunias and potatoes since planting near them can cause diseases from those plants to transfer. By planting potatoes near tomatoes, the chances of them catching potato blight disease can increase. Pesticides and natural enemies are not helpful against pinworms. After the harvesting of Celebrity tomatoes, it is suggested that all plants should immediately tilled to reduce the incidence of pinworms. Via the application of the organic insecticide Bacillus thuringiensis the number of fruitworms can be contained. This will ensure that insects that are beneficial to the plants do not get harmed through the application of pesticides.

== See also ==
- List of tomato cultivars
- Tomato production in Florida
