= Arredondo, Florida =

Populated place in Florida, US

Coordinates: 29°36′18″N 82°24′33″W

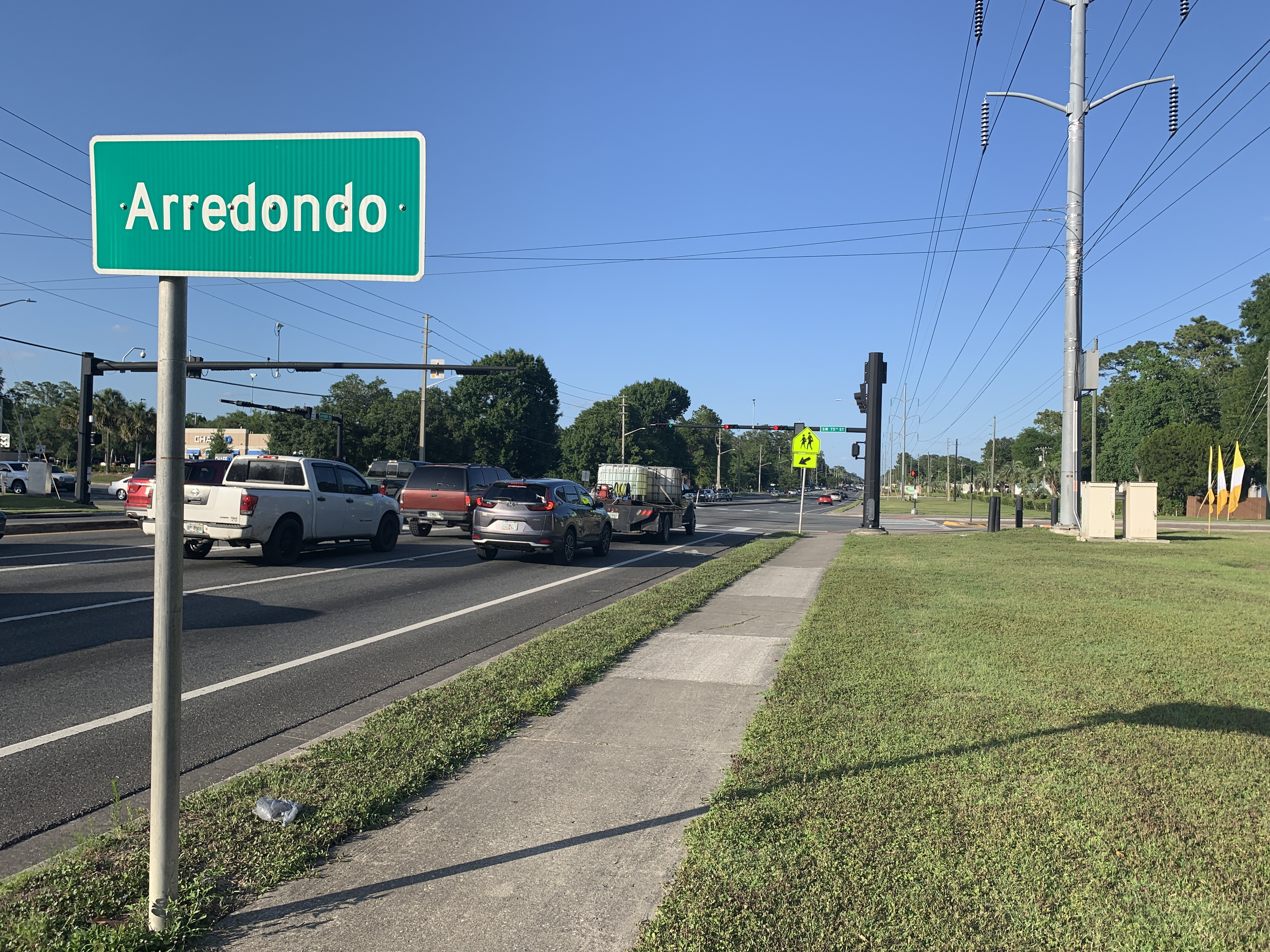
Florida State Road 24 as it enters Arredondo.

Arredondo, Florida is an unincorporated community in Alachua County. It lies about seven miles southwest of Gainesville on the highway from Gainesville to Archer. It was established as a shipping station on the Florida Railroad that ran from Fernandina through Gainesville to Cedar Key, largely absorbing an earlier community called Kanapaha. The Florida Railroad later became part of the Seaboard Air Line Railroad, which abandoned the line from Archer to Cedar Key in 1932. The tracks were removed in the 1970s.

The name of the community comes from the Arredondo Grant, a Spanish land grant that includes much of Alachua County and parts of Levy and Marion counties. A post office opened in Arredondo in 1873 and remained in service until 1925.

The area around Arredondo was used to raise cattle in the middle of the 19th century, and some cattle-raising continued into the 1880s. In the 1850s, cotton growers from South Carolina established plantations, including the Haile Homestead, in the area, which was then called Kanapaha. The soil around Arredondo is fertile, with underlying deposits of phosphate rock contributing to the fertility. After the Civil War, the cotton planters and newcomers to the area turned to vegetable, fruit and tree-nut production. In the 1883 season, 80,000 crates of vegetables were shipped from the Arredondo station. Strawberries shipped to New York in early February sold for $3.00 a quart.

Farmers began experimenting with the commercial production of tomatoes in the area of Arredondo in 1870. In 1872, 20 acres (8.1 ha) were planted to tomatoes, and Arredondo became the center of tomato-growing in Florida. Tomatoes were a profitable crop. In 1882, Florida tomatoes sold for $4.00 to $4.50 per bushel crate in Chicago. As railroads extended further south in Florida, tomato-growing also moved south, permitting an earlier harvest for shipment to the north. Commercial tomato growing, and commercial vegetable growing in general, had ceased in the area around Arredondo by 1900.

== See also ==
- Tomato production in Florida
