= Thiadiazine =

Organosulfur ring compound used in medicine

Identifiers
3D model (JSmol)	1,2,4: Interactive image; 4H-1,2,6: Interactive image; 1,3,4: Interactive image
PubChem CID	1,2,4: 21864932; 4H-1,2,6: 54157717; 1,3,4: 15789248
- InChI: 1,2,4: InChI=1S/C3H4N2S/c1-2-6-5-3-4-1/h1-3H,(H,4,5) Key: YROIEQHEBPTQKR-UHFFFAOYSA-N; 4H-1,2,6: InChI=1S/C3H4N2S/c1-2-4-6-5-3-1/h2-3H,1H2 Key: OMGHOYHDIXBBSI-UHFFFAOYSA-N; 1,3,4: InChI=1S/C3H4N2S/c1-2-6-3-5-4-1/h1-2H,3H2 Key: KLVQAIJZDCCJRZ-UHFFFAOYSA-N
- SMILES: 1,2,4: C1=CSNC=N1; 4H-1,2,6: C1C=NSN=C1; 1,3,4: C1N=NC=CS1

Properties
Chemical formula	C_{3}H_{4}N_{2}S
Molar mass	100.14 g·mol^{−1}

Related compounds
Related compounds	Thiadiazole
- Except where otherwise noted, data are given for materials in their standard state (at 25 °C [77 °F], 100 kPa). Infobox references

In organosulfur chemistry, thiadiazine is a heterocyclic compound containing a six-membered ring composed of three carbon atoms, one sulfur atom, and two nitrogen atoms. It exists in several isomeric forms, each characterized by the different arrangement of the sulfur and nitrogen atoms in the ring structure. Common isomers include 1,2,4-thiadiazine, 1,2,6-thiadiazine, and 1,3,4-thiadiazine. Thiadiazines have gained significant interest in organic and medicinal chemistry research due to their diverse potential biological activities, including antimicrobial, anti-inflammatory, and muscle relaxant properties. They have been explored their potential applications in treating conditions such as Huntington's disease, rheumatoid arthritis, and type 2 diabetes.
