= Plant-induced systemic resistance =

Plant defence mechanism against pathogens

Induced systemic resistance (ISR) is a resistance mechanism in plants that is activated by infection. Its mode of action does not depend on direct killing or inhibition of the invading pathogen, but rather on increasing physical or chemical barrier of the host plant. Like the Systemic Acquired Resistance (SAR) a plant can develop defenses against an invader such as a pathogen or parasite if an infection takes place. In contrast to SAR, which is triggered by the accumulation of salicylic acid, ISR instead relies on signal transduction pathways activated by jasmonate and ethylene.

== Discovery ==
The induction of plant-induced resistance to pathogen protection was identified in 1901 and was described as the "system of acquired resistance." Subsequently, several different terms have been used, namely, "acquired physiological immunity", "resistance displacement", "plant immune function" and "induced system resistance." Many forms of stimulus have been found to induce the plant to the virus, bacteria and fungi and other disease resistance including mechanical factors (dry ice damage, electromagnetic, ultraviolet, and low temperature and high temperature treatment, etc.), chemical factors (heavy metal salts, water, salicylic acid), and biological factors (fungi, bacteria, viruses, and their metabolites).

== Mode of action ==
Induced resistance of plants has 2 major modes of action: the SAR pathway and the ISR pathway. SAR can elicit a rapid local reaction, or hypersensitive response, the pathogen is limited to a small area of the site of infection. As mentioned, salicylic acid (SA) is the mode of action for the SAR pathway. ISR enhances the defense systems of the plant by jasmonic acid (JA) mode of action. Both act on the effect of the NPR-1, but SAR utilizes PR genes. The two mediated responses have regulatory effects on one another. As SA goes up, it can inhibit the effect of JA. There is a balance to be maintained when activating both responses.

ISR responses can be mediated by rhizobacteria. This has shown to be effective against necrotrophic pathogens and insect herbivores that are sensitive to JA/ET defenses. The importance of rhizobacteria-mediated ISR has been widely reported.

The biological factors of plant-induced system resistance generally include two broad categories, namely classical plant-induced resistance to disease induction (PGPR) or fungi that promote plant growth (PGPF), and plant growth-promoting rhizosphere bacteria (PGPR) or plant growth promoting fungi (PGPF). The difference is mainly due to the fact that the latter can effectively promote plant growth and increase crop yield while causing (or increasing) plant resistance to diseases (sometimes including pests).

== Effects on insects ==
Some studies have also reported negative effects of beneficial microbes on plant-insect interactions.

== Applied research ==
To date, work on induction of plant systemic resistance has shown that inducing plant system resistance work has important implications for basic and applied research.

Induced resistance applications in melons, tobacco, bean, potato, and rice have achieved significant success. Over the past decade, the study of induced system resistance has become a very active field of research.

Methods to artificially activate the ISR pathway is an active area of research. The research and application of inducing plant system resistance have been encouraging but are not yet a major factor in controlling plant pathogens. Incorporation into integrated pest management programs have shown some promising results. There is research regarding defense against leaf chewing insect pests, by the activation of jasmonic acid signalling triggered by root-associated microorganisms.

Some ongoing research into ISR includes (1) how to systematically improve the selection of induction factors; (2) the injury of induced factors; (3) the phenomenon of multi-effect of induced factors; (4) the effects of chemical induction factors on environmental factors; (5) Establishment of population stability of multivariate biological inducible factor. Research into ISR is driven largely by a response to pesticide use including 1) Increasing resistance by pathogens to pesticides, 2) the necessity to remove some of the more toxic pesticides from the market, 3) health and environment problems caused as an effect of pesticide use, and 4) the inability of certain pesticides to control some pathogens.

== See also ==
- Plant disease resistance
- Systemic acquired resistance
