= Systemic acquired resistance =

Type of immune response in plants

Systemic acquired resistance (SAR) is a "whole-plant" resistance response that occurs following an earlier localized exposure to a pathogen. SAR is analogous to the innate immune system found in animals, and although there are many shared aspects between the two systems, it is thought to be a result of convergent evolution. The systemic acquired resistance response is dependent on the plant hormone, salicylic acid.

== Discovery ==
While, it has been recognized since at least the 1930s that plants have some kind of induced immunity to pathogens, the modern study of systemic acquired resistance began in the 1980s when the invention of new tools allowed scientists to probe the molecular mechanisms of SAR. A number of 'marker genes' were characterized in the 1980s and 1990s which are strongly induced as part of the SAR response. These pathogenesis-related proteins (PR) belong to a number of different protein families. While there is substantial overlap, the spectrum of PR proteins expressed in a particular plant species is variable. It was noticed in the early 1990s that levels of salicylic acid (SA) increased dramatically in tobacco and cucumber upon infection. This pattern has been replicated in many other species since then. Further studies showed that SAR can also be induced by exogenous SA application and that transgenic Arabidopsis plants expressing a bacterial salicylate hydroxylase gene are unable to accumulate SA or mount an appropriate defensive response to a variety of pathogens.

The first plant receptors of conserved microbial signatures were identified in rice (XA21, 1995) and in Arabidopsis (FLS2, 2000).

== Mechanism ==
Plants have several immunity mechanisms to deal with infections and stress. When they are infected with pathogens the immune system recognizes pathogen-associated molecular patterns (PAMPs) via pattern recognition receptors (PRRs). This induces a PAMP-triggered immunity (PTI). Some pathogens carry effectors that suppress PTI in the plant and induce effector triggered susceptibility (ETS). In response, plants evolve resistance (R) genes that encode for proteins capable of recognizing the newly developed pathogen effectors, resulting in what is called effector triggered immunity (ETI). ETI often results in a form of programmed cell death (PCD), called hypersensitive response (HR). Pathogens can then evolve and develop new effectors for overcoming ETI, to which plants can respond by developing new R genes capable of recognizing the pathogen effector, thereby providing a new ETI. When PTI and ETI are activated in the local infected plant tissues, there is a signaling cascade that induces an immune response throughout the whole plant. This "whole plant" immune response is called systemic acquired resistance (SAR). SAR is characterized by accumulation of plant metabolites and genetic reprogramming both locally and systemically (surrounding tissues that were not infected). Salicylic acid (SA) and N-hydroxypipecolic acid (NHP) are two metabolites that have been shown to accumulate during SAR. Plants with reduced or no production of SA and Pip (a precursor to NHP) have been shown to exhibit reduced or no SAR response following infection.

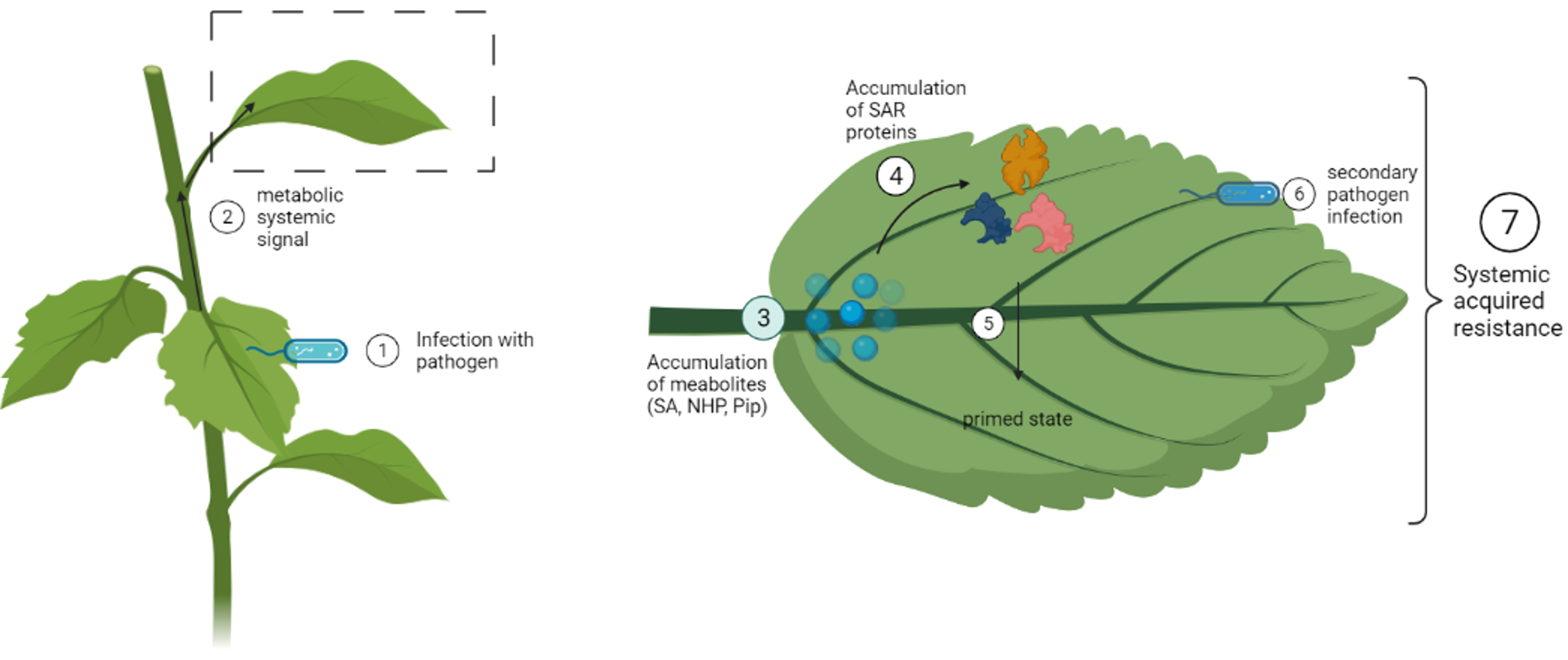
Systemic response after pathogen infection.

== Use in disease control ==
Some of the numerous species of bacteria and fungi, pathogen‐derived molecules, cell wall components, peptides, or plant extracts, which have been commercialized as either biological or natural agents for the control of crop diseases, have been shown to act by inducing SAR. Four synthetic chemicals, which act by inducing SAR, have been commercialised; acibenzolar‐S‐methyl, probenazole, tiadinil and isotianil. The compounds are pro-cides, which are converted in planta to the active compound. They are active in many plants but are mainly used on rice against rice blast, but they do not have a large market share of the fungal control market.

See also

- Plant disease resistance
- Hypersensitive response
- Phytopathology
- Plant-induced systemic resistance
