= History of slavery in Florida =

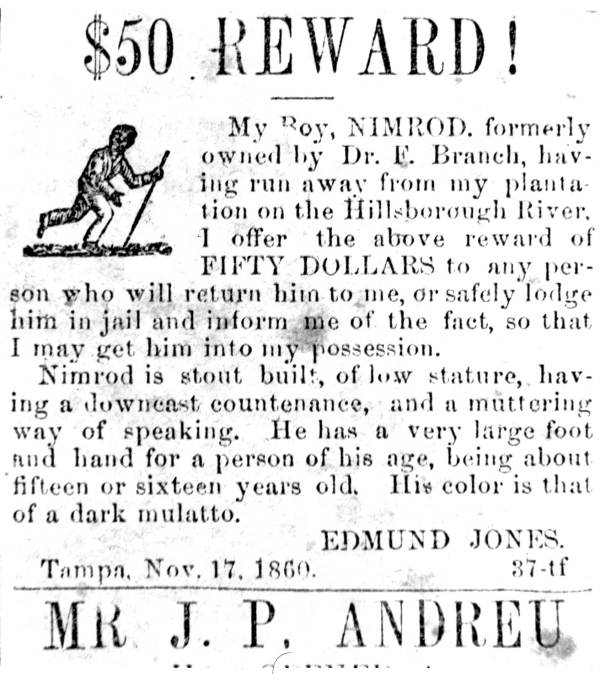
1860 Tampa newspaper ad offered reward for returning an enslaved teenager, Nimrod, escaped from a plantation on the Hillsborough River

Slavery in Florida occurred among Indigenous tribes and during Spanish and British rule. Florida's purchase by the United States from Spain in 1819 (effective 1821) was primarily a measure to strengthen the system of slavery on Southern plantations, by denying potential runaways the formerly safe haven of Florida. Florida became a slave state, seceded, and passed laws to exile or enslave free blacks. Even after abolition, forced labor continued.

Few enslaved Africans were imported into Florida from Cuba in the period of Spanish colonial rule, as there was little for them to do—no mines, no plantations. Starting in 1687, slaves escaping from English colonies to the north were freed when they reached Florida and accepted Catholic baptism. Black slavery in the region was widely established after Florida came under British then American control. Slavery in Florida was theoretically abolished by the 1863 Emancipation Proclamation issued by President Lincoln, though as the state was then part of the Confederacy this had little immediate effect.

Slavery in Florida did not end abruptly on one specific day. As news arrived of the end of the Civil War and the collapse of the Confederacy in the spring of 1865, slavery unofficially ended, as there were no more slave catchers or other authority to enforce the peculiar institution. Newly emancipated African Americans departed their plantations, often in search of relatives who were separated from their family. The end of slavery was made formal by the ratification of the Thirteenth Amendment in December 1865. Some of the characteristics of slavery, such as inability to leave an abusive situation, continued under sharecropping, convict leasing, and vagrancy laws. In the 20th and 21st centuries, conditions approximating slavery are found among marginal immigrant populations, especially migrant farm workers and trafficked sex workers. The Florida Slavery Memorial is planned.

== Slavery before arrival of the Europeans ==
Enslavement predates the period of European colonization and was practiced by various Indigenous peoples. Florida had some of the first African slaves in what is now the United States in 1526, as well as the first emancipation of escaping slaves in 1687 and the first settlement of free blacks in 1735.

== Spanish era ==
=== Exploration era (1513–1526) ===
The first European known to have explored the coasts of Florida was the Spanish explorer and governor of Puerto Rico, Juan Ponce de León, who likely ventured in 1513 as far north as the vicinity of the future St. Augustine, naming the peninsula he believed to be an island "La Florida" and claiming it for the Spanish Crown. It is likely that slaves were included in the voyage, but they were not recorded.

=== First Spanish occupation (1536–1763) ===
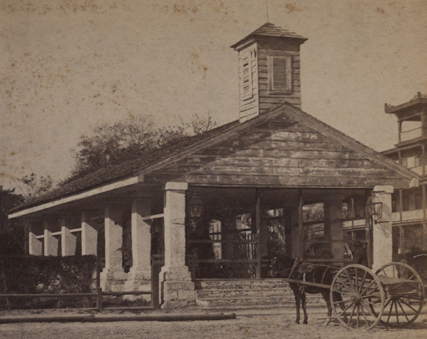
The old Spanish slave market that was constructed in accordance with King Phillip II's Spanish Royal Ordinance of 1573. (1886)

In 1528, a slave named Estevanico ("Little Steven") was brought to the area as part of the Narváez expedition, which then continued on to Texas. More African slaves arrived in Florida in 1539 with Hernando de Soto.

When the Spaniards founded the colonial settlement of San Agustín in 1565, the site already had enslaved Native Americans, whose ancestors had migrated from Cuba. The Spaniards did not bring many slaves to Florida as there was no work for them to do—no mines and no plantations. For the same reason very few Spaniards came to Florida; there were only three towns in the colony, supporting military/naval outposts: St. Augustine, St. Marks, and what is today Pensacola. Under Spanish colonial rule, the enslaved in Florida had rights. They could marry, own property, and purchase their own freedom. Free blacks, as long as they were Catholic, were not subject to legal discrimination. No one was born into slavery. Mixed "race" marriages were not illegal, and mixed "race" children could inherit property.

In October 1687, eleven enslaved Africans made their way from Carolina to Florida in a stolen canoe, and were emancipated by the Spanish authorities. A year later, Major William Dunlop, an officer in the Carolina militia, arrived in Florida to ask for compensation for Spanish attacks on Carolina and the return of the Africans to their enslaver, Governor Joseph Morton. The Spanish chose to compensate Morton instead, submitting a report to King Charles II on the event. On November 7, 1693, Charles II issued a decree freeing all slaves escaping from English North America who accepted Catholicism, similar to the May 29, 1680 Spanish decree for slaves escaping from the Lesser Antilles and the September 3, 1680, and June 1, 1685, decrees for escaping French slaves.

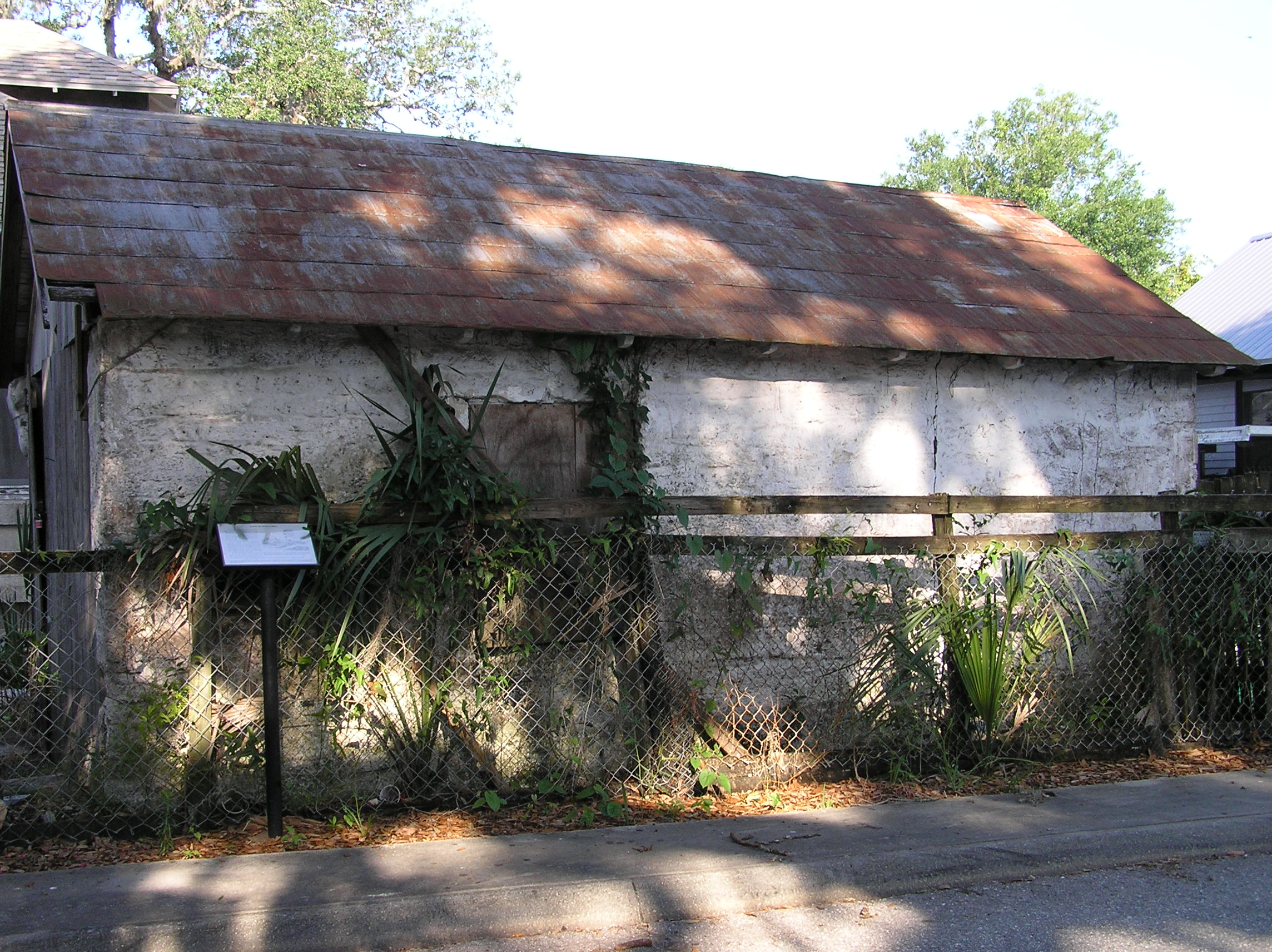
The "last slave house" located in Lincolnville and historically part of the Spanish "Buena Esperanza" plantation that operated from 1700 to 1763

In the early 1700s, Spanish Florida was a hotbed for the raiding Native Americans from the northern Carolina and Georgia areas. Though they were left alone for the most part by one of the original raiding groups, the Westos, Spanish Florida was heavily targeted by the later raiding groups, the Yamasee and Creek. These raids, in which villages were destroyed and local Native Americans were either killed or captured to be later sold as slaves to English colonists, drove the local Native Americans to the hands of the Spanish, who attempted to protect them as best they could from the raids. However, the strength of the Spanish dwindled and as the raids continued the Spanish and Spanish-allied natives were forced to retreat farther and farther back into the peninsula. The raids were so frequent that there were few natives left to capture, and so the Yamasee and the Creek began bringing fewer and fewer slaves to the Carolina colonies and were unable to effectively continue the trade. The retreat of the Spanish was only ended when the Yamasee and Creek entered what would later be known as the Yamasee War with the Carolina colony.

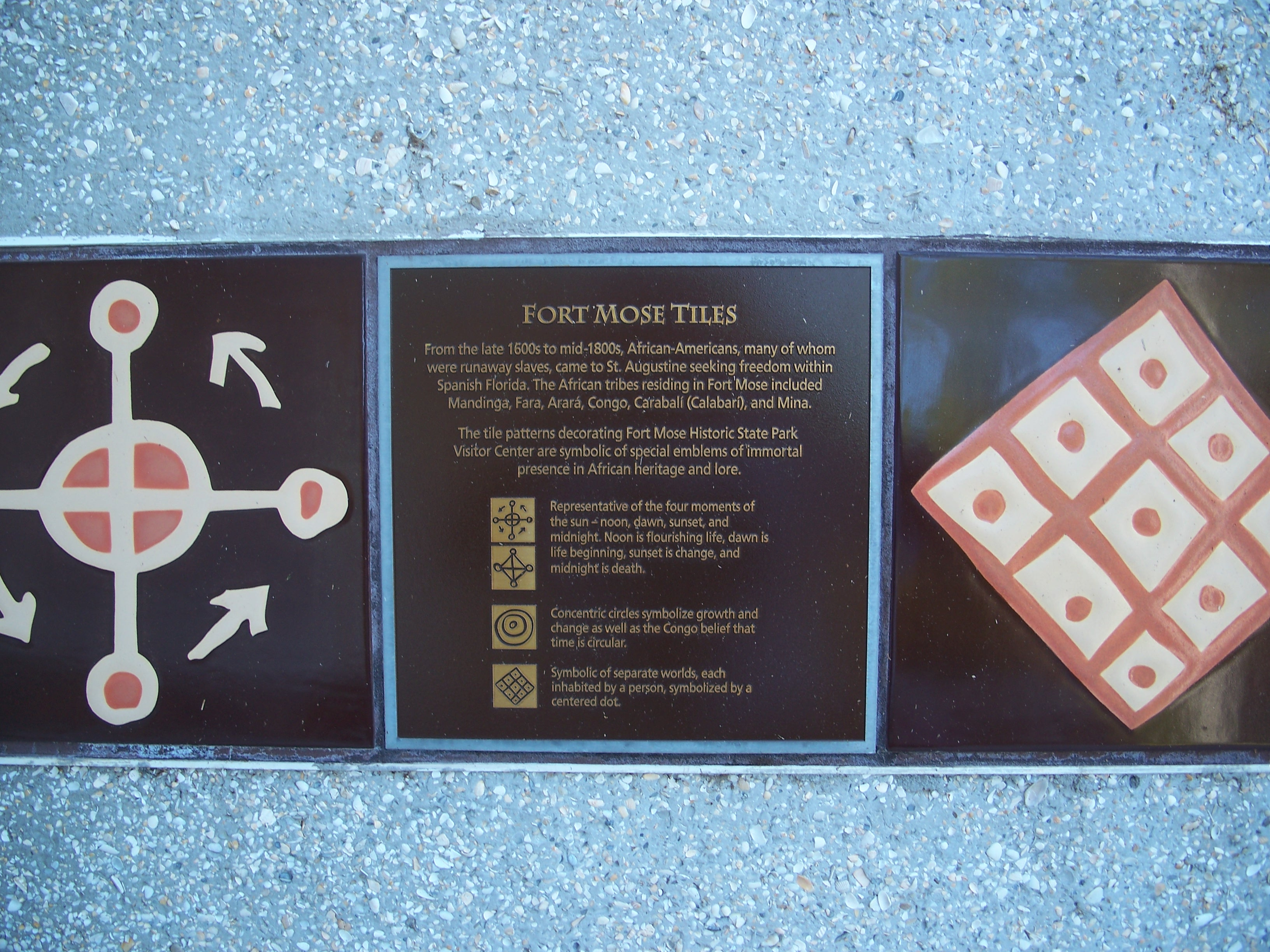
A plaque dedicated to symbols found at Fort Mose historic site

Since 1688, Spanish Florida had attracted numerous fugitive slaves who escaped from the British North American colonies. Once the slaves reached Florida, the Spanish freed them if they converted to Roman Catholicism; males of age had to complete a military obligation. Many settled in Gracia Real de Santa Teresa de Mose, the first settlement of free blacks in North America, near St. Augustine. The church started recording baptisms and deaths there in 1735, and a fort was built in 1738, part of the perimeter defenses of San Agustin. The freed slaves knew the border areas well and led military raids, under their own black officers, against the Carolinas, and against Georgia, founded in 1731. Another smaller group settled along the Apalachicola River in remote northwest Florida, centered on Prospect Bluff, future site of the famous Negro Fort.

=== British Florida (1763–1783) ===
In 1763, Great Britain took over Florida in an exchange with Spain after defeating France in the Seven Years' War. Spain evacuated its citizens from St. Augustine, including the residents of Fort Mose, transporting them to Cuba. As British colonists developed the colony for plantation agriculture, the percentage of slaves in the population in twenty years rose from 18% to almost 65% by 1783.

=== Second Spanish occupation (1783–1821) ===
Former slaves also found refuge among the Creek and Seminole, Native Americans who had established settlements in Florida at the invitation of the Spanish government. In 1771, Governor John Moultrie wrote to the Board of Trade that "It has been a practice for a good while past, for negroes to run away from their Masters, and get into the Indian towns, from whence it proved very difficult to get them back." When British colonial officials in Florida pressured the Native Americans to return the fugitive slaves, they replied that they had "merely given hungry people food, and invited the slaveholders to catch the runaways themselves."

After the American Revolution, slaves from the State of Georgia and the South Carolina Low Country continued to escape to Florida. By 1814, the black population, both free and enslaved, of Florida had risen to 57%, compared to 27% in 1786. The U.S. Army led increasingly frequent incursions into Spanish territory, including the 1817–1818 campaign by Andrew Jackson that became known as the First Seminole War. The United States afterwards effectively controlled East Florida. According to Secretary of State John Quincy Adams, the US had to take action there because Florida had become "a derelict open to the occupancy of every enemy, civilized or savage, of the United States, and serving no other earthly purpose than as a post of annoyance to them." Spain requested British intervention, but London declined to assist Spain in the negotiations. Some of President James Monroe's cabinet demanded Jackson's immediate dismissal, but Adams realized that it put the U.S. in a favorable diplomatic position, allowing him to negotiate very favorable terms.

The Spaniards had established outposts in Florida to prevent others from having safe ports to attack Spanish treasure fleets in the Caribbean and in the strait between Florida and the Bahamas. Florida did not produce anything the Spaniards wanted. The three garrisons were a financial drain, and it was not felt desirable to send settlers or additional garrisons. The Crown decided to cede the territory to the United States. It accomplished this through the Adams–Onís Treaty of 1819, which took effect in 1821.

=== Treatment of Blacks under Spanish rule ===
Under the Spaniards, enslaved workers had rights: to marry, to own property, to buy their own freedom. They were not chattel. Free Blacks, as long as they accepted Catholicism, were not subject to legal discrimination. No one was born into slavery. Mixed "race" marriages were not illegal, and mixed "race" children could inherit property, as later Zephaniah Kingsley's inheritors had to fight successfully for.

=== Zephaniah Kingsley ===
During the second Spanish period, when slaves continued to escape from their British, then American owners and take refuge in Florida, the North American slave trade was to a large extent centered on Florida. Besides those seeking to recover escaped slaves, the newly enslaved could be freely imported to Florida from Africa, and planters and their representatives went to Florida to buy them and then smuggle them into the U.S.

At the center of Florida's slave trade was the colorful trader and slavery defender, Quaker Zephaniah Kingsley, owner of slaving vessels (boats). He treated his enslaved well, allowed them to save for and buy their freedom (at a 50% discount), and taught them crafts like carpentry, for which reason his highly-trained, well-behaved slaves sold for a premium. After Florida became American, Kingsley, after trying unsuccessfully to prevent Florida from treating free Blacks as unwelcome (see below), left for what at the time was Haiti (today the Dominican Republic).

== Territorial Florida, under American rule (1821–1845) ==
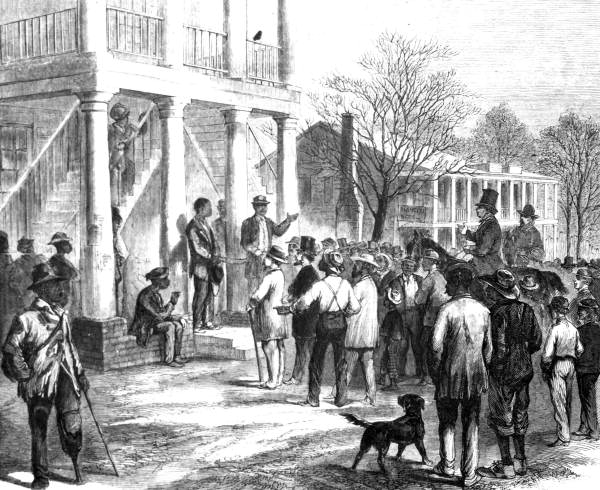
Selling a freedman to pay his fine: Monticello, Florida (1860)

Florida became an organized territory of the United States on February 22, 1821. (See Adams–Onís Treaty.) Slavery continued to be permitted; however, Spanish racial policies were replaced with a rigid set of laws that assumed that all Black persons, slave or free, were uncivilized and inferior to whites, and suitable only for slavery.

The free Blacks and Indian slaves, Black Seminoles, living near St. Augustine, fled to Havana, Cuba, to avoid coming under US control. Some Seminole also abandoned their settlements and moved further south. Hundreds of Black Seminoles and fugitive slaves escaped in the early nineteenth century from Cape Florida to the Bahamas, where they settled on Andros Island, founding Nicholls Town [sic], named for the Anglo-Irish commander and abolitionist who fostered their escape, Edward Nicolls [sic].

=== Free people of color and their perceived danger ===
In 1827, free negros were prohibited from entering Florida, and in 1828, those already there were prohibited from assembling in public. In 1829 a statute required a fine of $200 (equivalent to $6,047 in 2025) for every person manumitted (set free), and required the person freed to leave the Territory within 30 days.

In antebellum Florida, "Southerners came to believe that the only successful means of removing the threat of free Negroes was to expel them from the southern states or to change their status from free persons to... slaves." Free Negroes were perceived as "an evil of no ordinary magnitude," undermining the system of slavery. Slaves had to be shown that there was no advantage in being free; thus, free negroes became victims of the slaveholders' fears. Legislation became more forceful; the free negro had to accept his new role or leave the state, as in fact half the black population of Pensacola and St. Augustine immediately did (they left the country). Some citizens of Leon County, Florida, Florida's most populous and wealthiest county, which wealth was because Leon County had more slaves than any other county in Florida, petitioned the General Assembly to have all free negroes removed from the state. Legislation passed in 1847 required all free Negroes to have a white person as legal guardian; in 1855, an act was passed which prevented free Negroes from entering the state.^{Above it says 1827.} "In 1861, an act was passed requiring all free Negroes in Florida to register with the judge of probate in whose county they resided. The Negro, when registering, had to give his name, age, color, sex, and occupation, and had to pay one dollar to register.... All Negroes over twelve years of age had to have a guardian approved by the probate judge.... The guardian could be sued for any crime committed by the Negro; the Negro could not be sued. Under the new law, any free Negro or mulatto who did not register with the nearest probate judge was classified as a slave and became the lawful property of any white person who claimed possession."

In 1830, free Blacks were 5.2% of Florida's African American population; by 1860 they had declined to 1.5%.

== Florida a slave state (1845–1861) ==
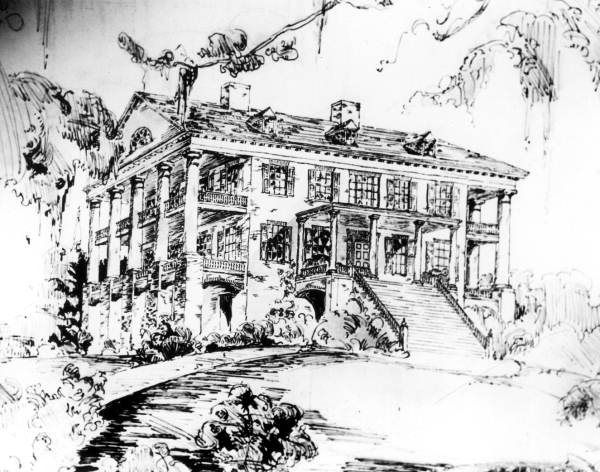
House on the Verdura Plantation in Leon County, Florida, built in 1832, burned in 1885. Drawing produced in about 1870.

American settlers began to establish cotton plantations in northern Florida, which required numerous laborers, which they supplied by buying slaves in the domestic market. On March 3, 1845, Florida became a slave state of the United States. Almost half the state's population were enslaved African Americans working on large cotton and sugar plantations, between the Apalachicola and Suwannee Rivers in the north-central part of the state. Like the people who owned them, many slaves had come from the coastal areas of Georgia and The Carolinas; they were part of the Gullah-Geechee culture of the South Carolina Lowcountry. Others were enslaved African Americans from the Upper South, who had been sold to traders taking slaves to the Deep South. By 1860, Florida had 140,424 people, of whom 44% were enslaved, and fewer than 1,000 free people of color. Their labor accounted for 85% of the state's cotton production. The 1860 Census also indicated that in Leon County, which was the center both of the Florida slave trade and of their plantation industry (see Plantations of Leon County), slaves constituted 73% of the population. As elsewhere, their value was greater than all the land of the county put together. (References in History of Tallahassee, Florida#Black history.)

== Florida secedes and becomes Confederate state (1861–1865) ==
Depiction of slaves being departed off the ship Williams in Key West (originally being captured by the USS Wyandotte)

In January 1861, nearly all delegates in the Florida Legislature approved an ordinance of secession, declaring Florida to be "a sovereign and independent nation"—an apparent reassertion to the preamble in Florida's Constitution of 1838, in which Florida agreed with Congress to be a "Free and Independent State." Protecting slavery was the reason for Florida's secession and for the creation of the Confederacy.

Confederate authorities used slaves as teamsters to transport supplies and as laborers in salt works and fisheries. Many Florida slaves working in these coastal industries escaped to the relative safety of Union-controlled enclaves during the American Civil War. Beginning in 1862, Union military activity in East and West Florida encouraged slaves in plantation areas to flee their owners in search of freedom. Some worked on Union ships and, beginning in 1863, with the Emancipation Proclamation, more than a thousand enlisted as soldiers and sailors in the United States Colored Troops of the military.

Escaped and freed slaves provided Union commanders with valuable intelligence about Confederate troop movements. They also passed back news of Union advances to the men and women who remained enslaved in Confederate-controlled Florida. Planter fears of slave uprisings increased as the war went on.

In May 1865, Federal control was re-established, and slavery abolished.

== Human trafficking in the 20th and 21st centuries ==
After California and New York, Florida has the most human trafficking cases in the United States. Florida has had cases of sex trafficking, domestic servitude, and forced labor.

Florida has a large agricultural economy and a large immigrant population, which has made it a prime environment for forced labor, particularly in the tomato industry. Concerted efforts have led to the freeing of thousands of slaves in recent years. The National Human Trafficking Resource Center reported receiving 1,518 calls and emails in 2015 about human trafficking in Florida.

== See also ==
- Agriculture in Florida
- Negro Fort
- Ocoee massacre
- Perry massacre
- Rosewood massacre
- Plantations of Leon County, Florida
- Yulee Sugar Mill Ruins Historic State Park
- History of slavery in the United States by state
- Tomato production in Florida
