= 1,2,3-Benzothiadiazole =

Organic heterocyclic aromatic chemical

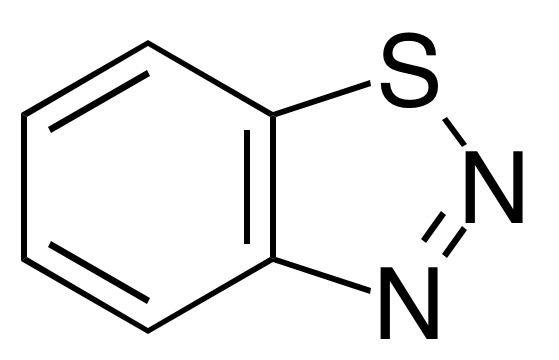

Names
- Preferred IUPAC name 1,2,3-Benzothiadiazole
- Other names: Benzothiadiazole; Benzthiadiazole; Azabenzothiadiazole; benzo-1,2,3-thiadiazole

Identifiers
CAS Number	273-77-8
3D model (JSmol)	Interactive image
ChemSpider	60829
EC Number	205-989-4
MeSH	benzo-1,2,3-thiadiazole
PubChem CID	67505
UNII	R3PA3EL3RP
CompTox Dashboard (EPA)	DTXSID00181747
- InChI: InChI=1S/C6H4N2S/c1-2-4-6-5(3-1)7-8-9-6/h1-4H Key: FNQJDLTXOVEEFB-UHFFFAOYSA-N
- SMILES: C1=CC=C2C(=C1)N=NS2

Properties
Chemical formula	C_{6}H_{4}N_{2}S
Molar mass	136.17 g·mol^{−1}
Appearance	colorless solid
Density	1.499 g/cm^{3}
Melting point	36–37 °C (97–99 °F; 309–310 K)
Boiling point	220.5 °C (428.9 °F; 493.6 K)

Related compounds
Related compounds	2,1,3-Benzothiadiazole
- Except where otherwise noted, data are given for materials in their standard state (at 25 °C [77 °F], 100 kPa). Infobox references

1,2,3-Benzothiadiazole is a bicyclic aromatic chemical composed of a benzene ring that is fused to a 1,2,3-thiadiazole. A colorless solid, the compound is soluble in organic solvents.

== Preparation ==
1,2,3-Benzothiadiazole is readily prepared by the diazotisation reaction of 2-aminothiophenol or its disulfide with sodium nitrite, as originally reported in 1887 and reviewed in several subsequent publications.

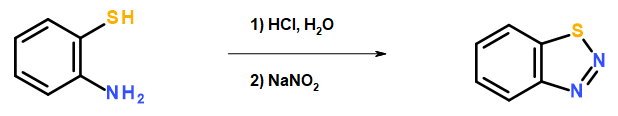

By the Herz reaction anilines can be converted to benzothiadiazole. The method is attractive since less elaborate precursors (merely anilines) are required. Upon treatment with disulfur dichloride, the anilines give the intermediate 1,3,2-benzothiazathiolium salt, which is diazotised to complete the formation of a 1,2,3-benzothiadiazole. The parent system cannot be made this way, since the use of aniline in this reaction leads to formation of the 6-chloro derivative.

== Structure and bonding ==
The molecule is planar. The N-N and S-N distances are respectively 128 and 171 picometers, indicative of multiple bond character. Like naphthalene, this heterocycle is a 10-electron system.

== Reactions ==
1,2,3-benzothiadiazole is much less nucleophilic than naphthalene. Nitration is slow. For that reason, many of its simple derivatives have been made from 2-aminothiophenols already having additional substituents.

1,2,3-benzothiadiazole is a very weak base and alkylation reactions give exclusively the 3-amino quaternary salt.

== Applications ==
1,2,3-benzothiadiazole has been claimed to synergise insecticides including dicrotophos but has not been commercialised for that application. The only derivative to have found significant use is the fungicide acibenzolar-S-methyl.
