= 2,1,3-Benzothiadiazole =

Organic bicyclic chemical

Names
- Preferred IUPAC name 2,1,3-Benzothiadiazole
- Other names: Piazthiole; Benzisothiadiazole; Benzo[1,2,5]thiadiazole

Identifiers
CAS Number	273-13-2
3D model (JSmol)	Interactive image
ChemSpider	60826
ECHA InfoCard	100.005.442
EC Number	205-985-2
PubChem CID	67502
UNII	8FTH8AJA9H
CompTox Dashboard (EPA)	DTXSID3059767
- InChI: InChI=1S/C6H4N2S/c1-2-4-6-5(3-1)7-9-8-6/h1-4H Key: PDQRQJVPEFGVRK-UHFFFAOYSA-N
- SMILES: C1=CC2=NSN=C2C=C1

Properties
Chemical formula	C_{6}H_{4}N_{2}S
Molar mass	136.17 g·mol^{−1}
Melting point	54.0 °C (129.2 °F; 327.1 K)
Boiling point	203.0 °C (397.4 °F; 476.1 K)

Related compounds
Related compounds	1,2,3-Benzothiadiazole

Hazards
- GHS labelling
Pictograms	(GHS07: Exclamation mark)
Signal word	Warning
Hazard statements	H315, H319, H335
Precautionary statements	P261, P264, P271, P280, P302+P352, P304+P340, P305+P351+P338, P312, P321, P332+P313, P337+P313, P362, P403+P233, P405, P501
- Except where otherwise noted, data are given for materials in their standard state (at 25 °C [77 °F], 100 kPa). Infobox references

2,1,3-Benzothiadiazole is a bicyclic molecule composed of a benzene ring that is fused to a 1,2,5-thiadiazole.

== Preparation and structure ==
2,1,3-Benzothiadiazole has been known since the 19th century. It is readily prepared in at least 85% yield from o-phenylenediamine by reaction with two equivalents of thionyl chloride in pyridine. The by-products are sulfur dioxide and HCl.

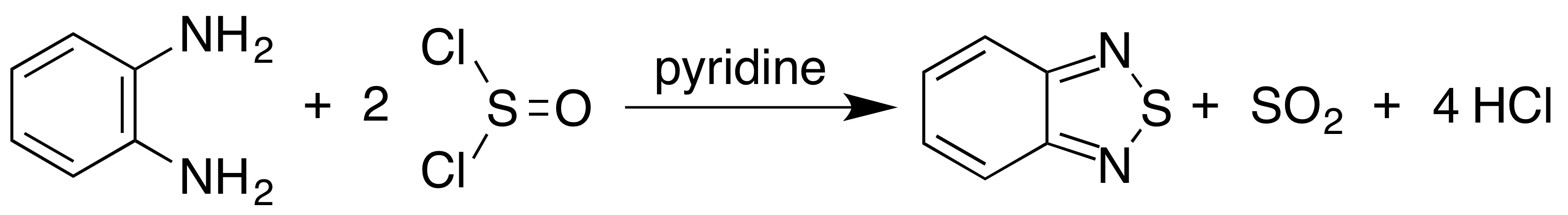

There are a number of alternative methods used to make this heterocycle and these have been reviewed. The crystal structure of the compound was determined in 1951, when it had the common name piazthiol(e).

== Reactions ==
The extent of the aromaticity of the compound was examined by a study of its proton NMR spectrum and comparison with naphthalene, which allowed the conclusion that it and related oxygen and selenium heterocycles did behave as 10-electron systems in which the 2-heteroatom contributed its lone pair to the ring current, in accordance with Hückel's rule.

As a result, 2,1,3-benzothiadiazole undergoes the standard chemistry of aromatic compounds, for example readily forming nitro and chloro derivatives. The chemistry of this heterocycle and its simple derivatives has been reviewed.

Under reducing conditions, 2,1,3-benzothiadiazoles can be converted back to the 1,2-diaminobenzene compounds from which they were prepared. This can be a useful way to protect a pair of reactive amino groups while other transformations are performed in the benzene ring to which they are attached.

Bromination of 2,1,3-Benzothiadiazole is commonly performed to synthesize 4,7-dibromo-2,1,3-benzothiadiazole. This derivative is extensively used as building block in the design and synthesis of larger molecules and conductive polymers via Suzuki-Miyaura cross-coupling reactions.

Typical bromination conditions used in the synthesis of ,7-dibromo-2,1,3-benzothiadiazole

== Derivatives ==
2,1,3-Benzothiadiazole derivatives containing carbazole units have been found to be luminescent, with high emission intensity and quantum efficiency.

Different π-extended molecular systems based on 2,1,3-benzothiadiazole have been built to study fundamental structure–property relationships. One example of this type of oligomer consist of extended thiophene building blocks as electron donors and 2,1,3-benzothiadiazole as electron aceptor. This oligomer was synthesized using a Sonogashira cross-coupling reaction and it showed low HOMO–LUMO gaps which could be interesting for organic semiconductor applications.

Asymmetric derivatives with diphenylamine donors, cyanoacrylic acid acceptors and thiophene linkers bridged by a 2,1,3-benzothiadiazole have been designed as organic dyes with improved charge separation properties when compared to classic cyanine and hemicyanine dyes.

== Applications ==
2,1,3-Benzothiadiazole has been of interest as a redox-active organic component in flow batteries owing to its favourable solubility, low reduction potential and fast electrochemical kinetics.

Such properties in derivatives containing this heterocycle have made it of growing interest in dyestuffs, white light-emitting polymers, solar cells, and in luminescence studies.
