= Acibenzolar-S-methyl =

Skeletal formula of acibenzolar-S-methyl
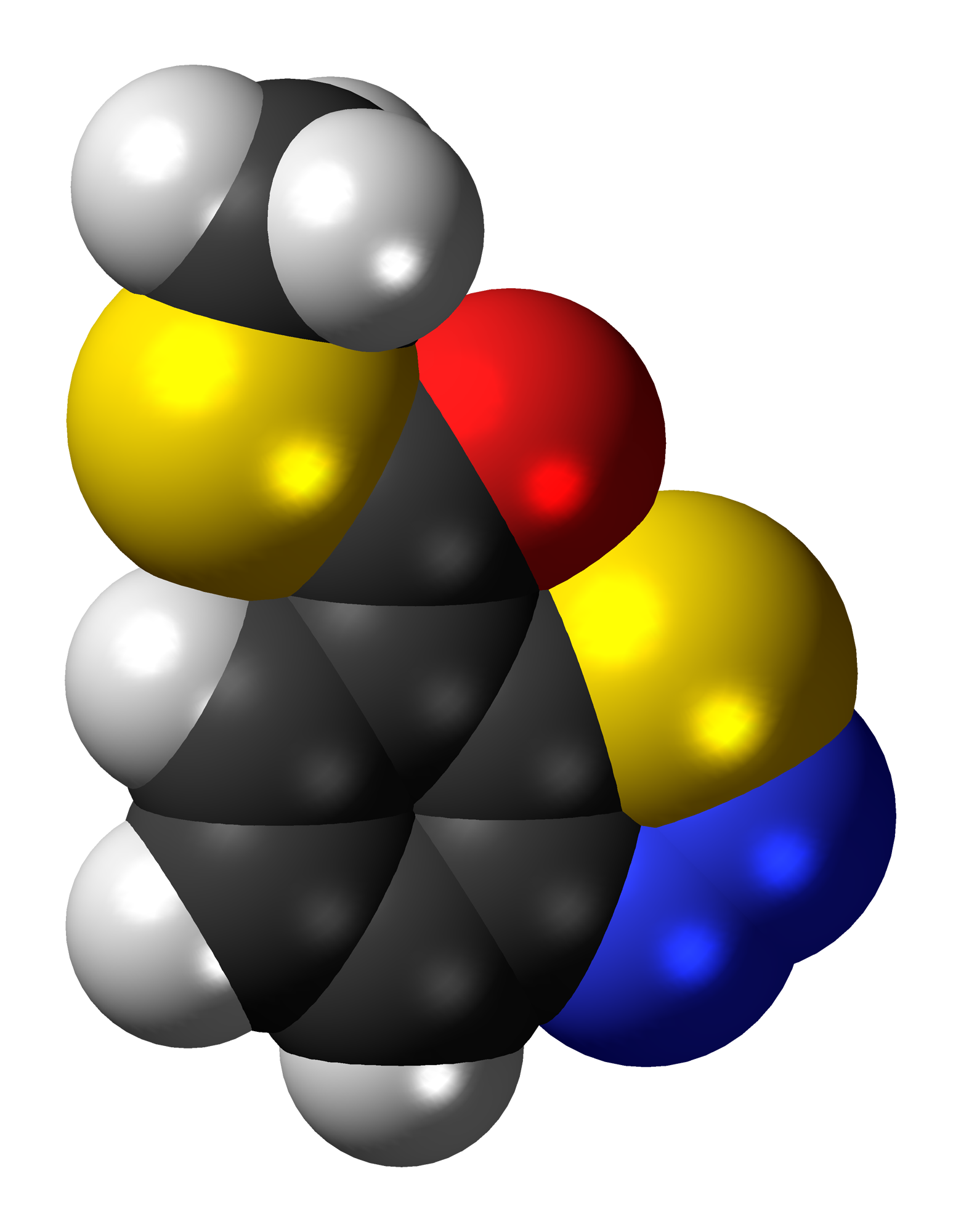

Names
- Preferred IUPAC name S-Methyl 1,2,3-benzothiadiazole-7-carbothioate
- Other names BTH, CGA245704

Identifiers
CAS Number	135158-54-2
3D model (JSmol)	Interactive image; Interactive image
ChEBI	CHEBI:73178
ChEMBL	ChEMBL425055
ChemSpider	77928
ECHA InfoCard	100.101.876
EC Number	420-050-0
MeSH	S-methyl+benzo(1,2,3)thiadiazole-7-carbothioate
PubChem CID	86412
UNII	BCW6119347
CompTox Dashboard (EPA)	DTXSID1032519
- InChI: InChI=1S/C8H6N2OS2/c1-12-8(11)5-3-2-4-6-7(5)13-10-9-6/h2-4H,1H3 Key: UELITFHSCLAHKR-UHFFFAOYSA-N; InChI=1/C8H6N2OS2/c1-12-8(11)5-3-2-4-6-7(5)13-10-9-6/h2-4H,1H3 Key: UELITFHSCLAHKR-UHFFFAOYAA
- SMILES: CSC(=O)c1cccc2nnsc12; CSC(=O)C1=C2SN=NC2=CC=C1

Properties
Chemical formula	C_{8}H_{6}N_{2}OS_{2}
Molar mass	210.27 g·mol^{−1}
Appearance	White to beige crystalline powder
Melting point	133 °C (271 °F; 406 K)
Boiling point	267 °C (513 °F; 540 K)
Solubility in water	7.7 mg/L (20 °C)
log P	3.1

Hazards
- GHS labelling
Pictograms	(GHS07: Exclamation mark) (GHS09: Environmental hazard)
Signal word	Warning
Hazard statements	H315, H317, H319, H335, H410
Precautionary statements	P261, P271, P272, P273, P280, P302+P352, P304+P340, P305+P351+P338, P312, P321, P332+P313, P333+P313, P337+P313, P362, P363, P391, P403+P233, P405, P501

Related compounds
Related compounds	1,2,3-benzothiadiazole-7-carboxylic acid
- Except where otherwise noted, data are given for materials in their standard state (at 25 °C [77 °F], 100 kPa). Infobox references

Acibenzolar-S-methyl is the ISO common name for an organic compound that is used as a fungicide. Unusually, it is not directly toxic to fungi but works by inducing systemic acquired resistance, the natural defence system of plants.

== History ==
In the 1980s, researchers at Ciba-Geigy in Switzerland were seeking novel fungicides. They discovered that the methyl ester of 1,2,3-benzothiadiazole-7-carboxylic acid, and many other derivatives, had useful activity on fungal diseases, for example Pyricularia oryzae on rice. In subsequent studies it was shown that the compound responsible for the biological activity was the carboxylic acid itself but that for optimum activity when used commercially it was important to choose a derivative which met requirements of product safety, ease of application and appropriate physical properties for translocation in the crop. After many derivatives of the acid had been tested, the S-methyl thioester was chosen for development under the code name CGA245704. The product was launched in 1996 and is now sold by Syngenta with brand names including Bion and Actigard.

== Synthesis ==
The first synthesis of the parent 1,2,3-benzothiadiazole-7-carboxylic acid was disclosed in patents filed by Ciba-Geigy. The heterocyclic ring of the 1,2,3-benzothiadiazole core is formed by the classic ring-closure of a thiol onto a diazonium group adjacent in its benzene ring. One example from the patent starts with methyl 2-chloro-3-nitrobenzoate, which reacts with benzyl mercaptan to give a thioether, which is converted by catalytic hydrogenation using Raney nickel to 3-amino-2-benzylthiobenzoic acid methyl ester. This intermediate, as its hydrochloride salt, is treated with sodium nitrite in water to give 7-methoxycarbonyl-1,2,3-benzothiadiazole in 86% yield after recrystallization.

Conversion of the ester into the thioester is by hydrolysis to form the free carboxylic acid followed by its conversion to the S-methyl thioester in a standard chemical transformation via the acid chloride.

== Mechanism of action ==
Acibenzolar-S-methyl has an unusual mechanism of action for a fungicide. It is not directly toxic to the fungus but instead activates the natural defences of the crop in a manner similar to the known role of salicylic acid and methyl jasmonate. The genes for systemic acquired resistance are induced and pathogenesis-related proteins are produced. The thioester is a propesticide for its active carboxylic acid metabolite. This hydrolysis reaction occurs in the plant, catalyzed by methyl salicylate esterase.

== Usage ==
=== In the USA ===
Pesticides are required to seek registration from appropriate authorities in the country in which they will be used. In the United States, the Environmental Protection Agency (EPA) is responsible for regulating pesticides under the Federal Insecticide, Fungicide, and Rodenticide Act (FIFRA) and the Food Quality Protection Act (FQPA). A pesticide can only be used legally according to the directions on the label that is included at the time of the sale of the pesticide. The purpose of the label is "to provide clear directions for effective product performance while minimizing risks to human health and the environment". A label is a legally binding document that mandates how the pesticide can and must be used and failure to follow the label as written when using the pesticide is a federal offence.

Acibenzolar-S-methyl is registered in the US for use either as a seed treatment or for direct spraying on crops. Since it activates the crop's own defence mechanisms, it is not usually effective in curing established disease, only in protecting against future disease development. As a seed treatment it is registered for use on cotton, sunflower and sorghum while for spraying it is licensed on a wide range of vegetable crops. The estimated annual use of acibenzolar-S-methyl in US agriculture is mapped by the US Geological Survey and shows a growing trend from its introduction in 2000 to 2017, the latest date for which figures are available. However, the total annual use has never exceeded 8000 lb (3600 kg), which is very low for an agrochemical. As expected given the main use on fruit and vegetables, the main areas of use are in California and Florida.

=== In Europe ===
The product is also registered in Europe, where there is a monitoring programme to make sure that residues in food are below the limits set by the European Food Safety Authority. It is sometimes mixed with other pesticides to provide an extra degree of control by activating the crop's defence mechanisms in addition to the lethal effect of the main ingredient.

== Human safety ==
Acibenzolar-S-methyl has little toxicity to mammals with an LD_{50} of over 2000 mg/kg (rats, oral). However, it can cause moderate eye irritation. First aid information is included with the label. The Codex Alimentarius database maintained by the FAO lists the maximum residue limits for acibenzolar-S-methyl and its parent acid in various food products.

== Resistance management ==
Although fungal populations have the ability to develop resistance to fungicides, the mechanism of action of acibenzolar-S-methyl gives it an advantage over conventional pesticides owing to its lack of direct toxicity to fungi. Nevertheless, regulatory bodies such as the EPA and the Fungicides Resistance Action Committee (FRAC) monitor the risks of resistance developing: FRAC has assigned acibenzolar-S-methyl into its own class (group P01 fungicide).
