= Thiadiazoles =

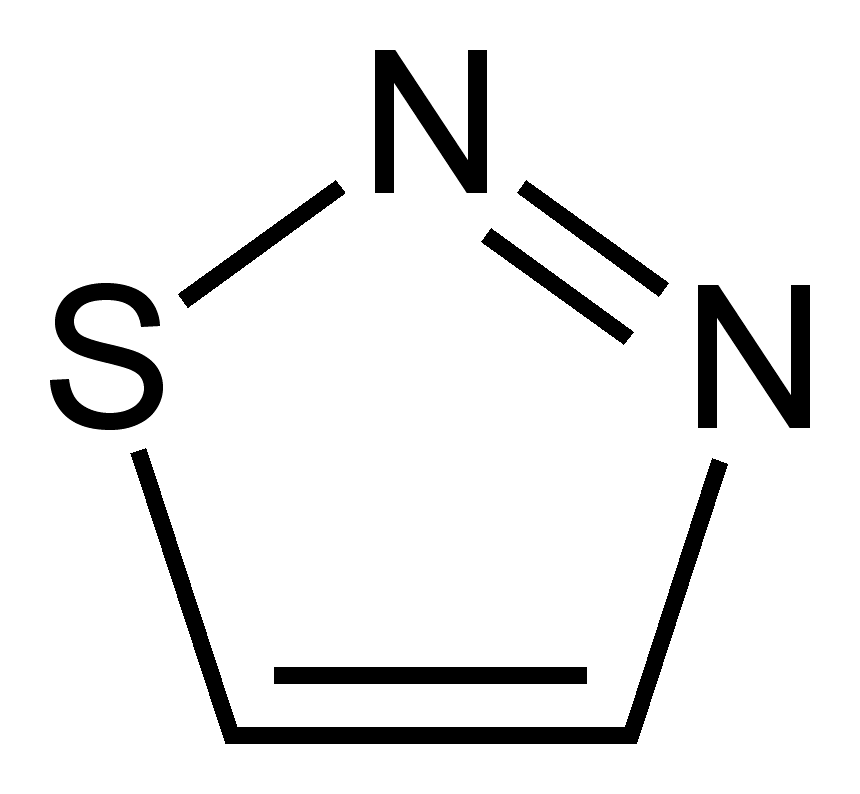
1,2,3-Thiadiazole
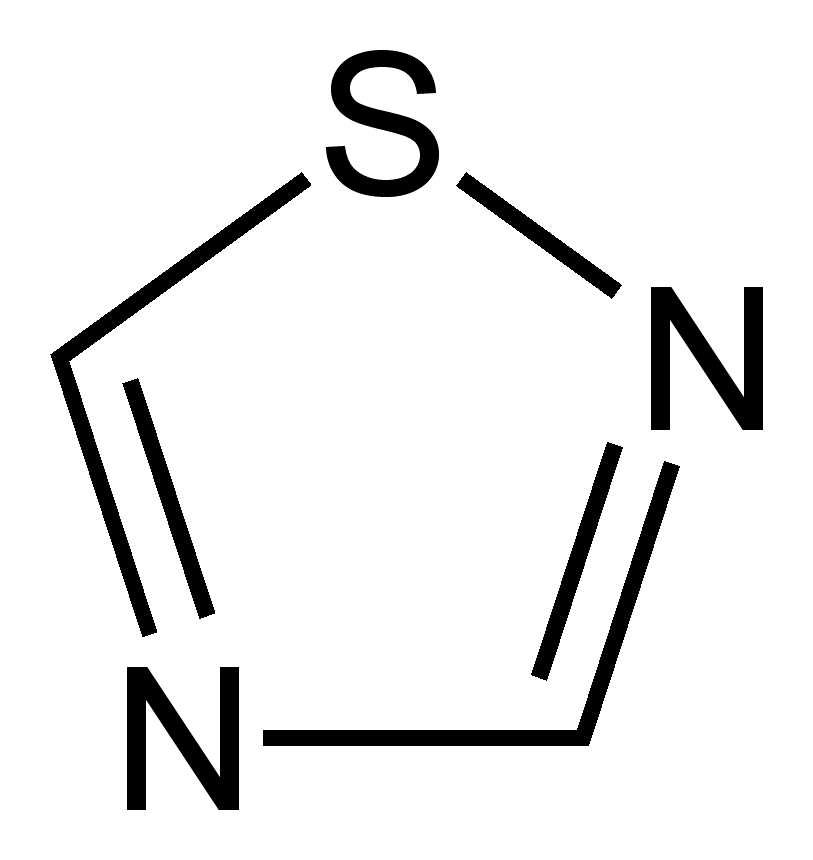
1,2,4-Thiadiazole
1,2,5-Thiadiazole
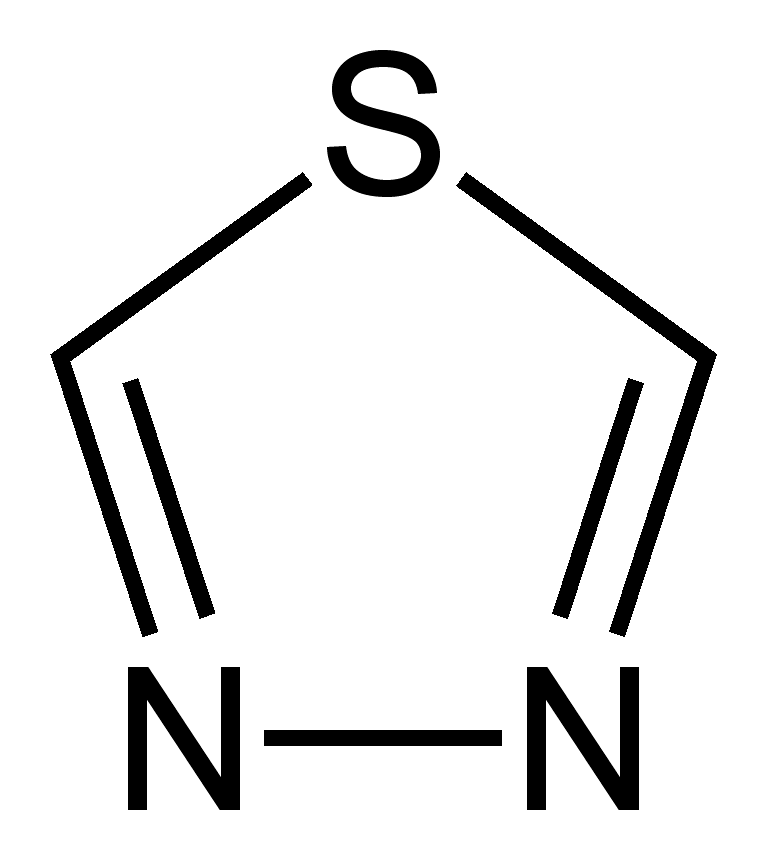
1,3,4-Thiadiazole

Identifiers
CAS Number	1,2,3: 288-48-2; 1,2,4: 288-92-6; 1,2,5: 288-39-1; 1,3,4: 289-06-5
3D model (JSmol)	1,2,3: Interactive image; 1,2,4: Interactive image; 1,2,5: Interactive image; 1,3,4: Interactive image
ChEBI	1,2,3: CHEBI:39468; 1,2,4: CHEBI:39471; 1,2,5: CHEBI:39469; 1,3,4: CHEBI:39472
ChemSpider	1,2,5: 486419
EC Number	1,3,4: 869-482-5
PubChem CID	1,2,3: 67518; 1,2,4: 6451464; 1,2,5: 559537; 1,3,4: 119391
UNII	1,3,4: 14IAC3GH7G
CompTox Dashboard (EPA)	1,2,3: DTXSID30182984; 1,2,4: DTXSID50182986; 1,2,5: DTXSID10182982; 1,3,4: DTXSID00183089
- InChI: 1,2,3: InChI=1S/C2H2N2S/c1-2-5-4-3-1/h1-2H Key: UGUHFDPGDQDVGX-UHFFFAOYSA-N; 1,2,4: InChI=1S/C2H2N2S/c1-3-2-5-4-1/h1-2H Key: YGTAZGSLCXNBQL-UHFFFAOYSA-N; 1,2,5: InChI=1S/C2H2N2S/c1-2-4-5-3-1/h1-2H Key: UDGKZGLPXCRRAM-UHFFFAOYSA-N; 1,3,4: InChI=1S/C2H2N2S/c1-3-4-2-5-1/h1-2H Key: MBIZXFATKUQOOA-UHFFFAOYSA-N
- SMILES: 1,2,3: C1=CSN=N1; 1,2,4: C1=NSC=N1; 1,2,5: C1=NSN=C1; 1,3,4: C1=NN=CS1

Properties
Chemical formula	C_{2}H_{2}N_{2}S
Molar mass	86.11 g·mol^{−1}

Related compounds
Related compounds	Thiadiazine
- Except where otherwise noted, data are given for materials in their standard state (at 25 °C [77 °F], 100 kPa). Infobox references

In chemistry, thiadiazoles are a sub-family of azole compounds, with the name thiadiazole originating from the Hantzsch–Widman nomenclature. Structurally, they are five-membered heterocyclic compounds containing one sulfur and two nitrogen atoms. The ring is aromatic by virtue of the two double bonds and one of the lone pairs of electrons of sulfur. Four constitutional isomers are possible, differing by the relative positions of the sulfur and nitrogen atoms. The nomenclature thus includes the locations of each of those three atoms, with the first of the three numbers referring to the sulfur.

The parent compounds are rarely synthesized and possess no particular application, however, compounds bearing them as a structural motif are fairly common in pharmacology. Of them, 1,3,4-thiadiazole is the most common, appearing in such medications as cephazolin and acetazolamide.

3,4-Dichloro-1,2,5-thiadiazole arises readily from cyanogen.

In the Hurd–Mori reaction, an acyl hydrazone reacts with thionyl chloride to give a 1,2,3-thiadiazole.
