= List of interstellar and circumstellar molecules =

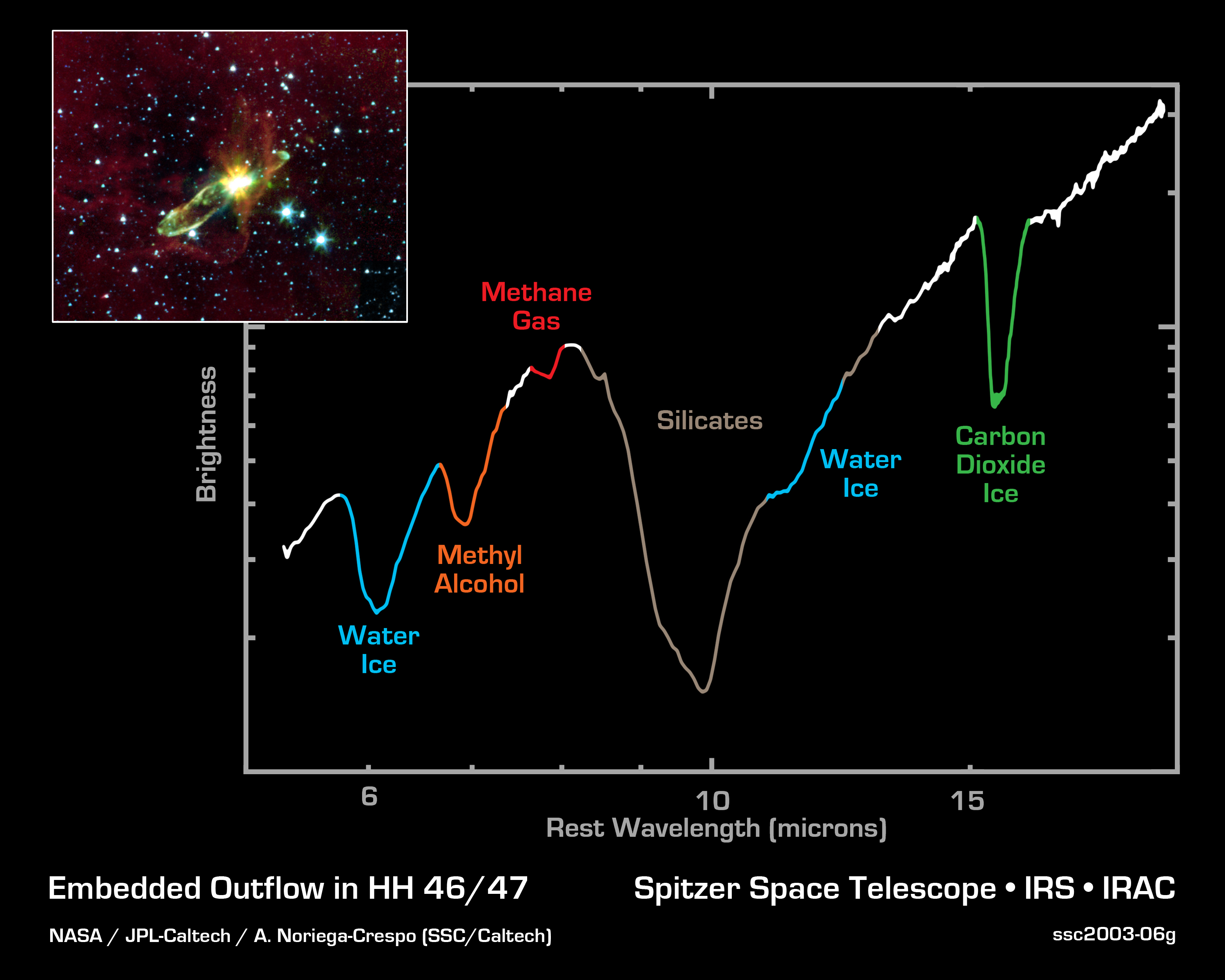
Infrared spectrum of HH 46/47 (image in inset), with vibrational bands of several molecules labelled in colour

This is a list of molecules that have been detected in the interstellar medium and circumstellar envelopes, grouped by the number of component atoms. The chemical formula is listed for each detected compound, along with any ionized form that has also been observed.

== Background ==
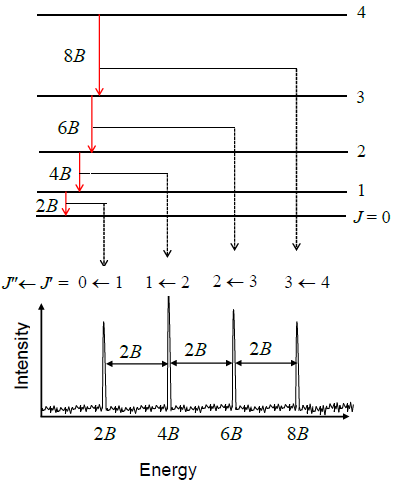
Idealised example of the rotational spectrum (bottom) produced by transitions between different rotational energy levels (top) of a simple linear molecule. $B$ is the rotational constant of the molecule, $J$ is the rotational quantum number, $J'$ is the upper level and $J''$ is the lower level.

The molecules listed below were detected through astronomical spectroscopy. Their spectral features arise because molecules either absorb or emit a photon of light when they transition between two molecular energy levels. The energy (and thus the wavelength) of the photon matches the energy difference between the levels involved. Molecular electronic transitions occur when one of the molecule's electrons moves between molecular orbitals, producing a spectral line in the ultraviolet, optical or near-infrared parts of the electromagnetic spectrum. Alternatively, a vibrational transition transfers quanta of energy to (or from) vibrations of molecular bonds, producing signatures in the mid- or far-infrared. Gas-phase molecules also have quantised rotational levels, leading to transitions at microwave or radio wavelengths.

Sometimes a transition can involve more than one of these types of energy level e.g. ro-vibrational spectroscopy changes both the rotational and vibrational energy level. Occasionally all three occur together, as in the Phillips band of C_{2} (diatomic carbon), in which an electronic transition produces a line in the near-infrared, which is then split into several vibronic bands by a simultaneous change in vibrational level, which in turn are split again into rotational branches.

The spectrum of a particular molecule is governed by the selection rules of quantum chemistry and by its molecular symmetry. Some molecules have simple spectra which are easy to identify, whilst others (even some small molecules) have extremely complex spectra with flux spread among many different lines, making them far harder to detect. Interactions between the atomic nuclei and the electrons sometimes cause further hyperfine structure of the spectral lines. If the molecule exists in multiple isotopologues (versions containing different atomic isotopes), the spectrum is further complicated by isotope shifts.

Detection of a new interstellar or circumstellar molecule requires identifying a suitable astronomical object where it is likely to be present, then observing it with a telescope equipped with a spectrograph working at the required wavelength, spectral resolution and sensitivity. The first molecule detected in the interstellar medium was the methylidyne radical (CH^{•}) in 1937, through its strong electronic transition at 4300 angstroms (in the optical). Advances in astronomical instrumentation have led to increasing numbers of new detections. From the 1950s onwards, radio astronomy began to dominate new detections, with sub-mm astronomy also becoming important from the 1990s.

The inventory of detected molecules is highly biased towards certain types which are easier to detect. For example, radio astronomy is most sensitive to small linear molecules with a high molecular dipole. The most common molecule in the Universe, H_{2} (molecular hydrogen), is completely invisible to radio telescopes because it has no dipole; its electronic transitions are too energetic for optical telescopes, so detection of H_{2} required ultraviolet observations with a sounding rocket. Vibrational lines are often not specific to an individual molecule, allowing only the general class to be identified. For example, the vibrational lines of polycyclic aromatic hydrocarbons (PAHs) were identified in 1984, showing the class of molecules is very common in space, but it took until 2021 to identify any specific PAHs through their rotational lines.

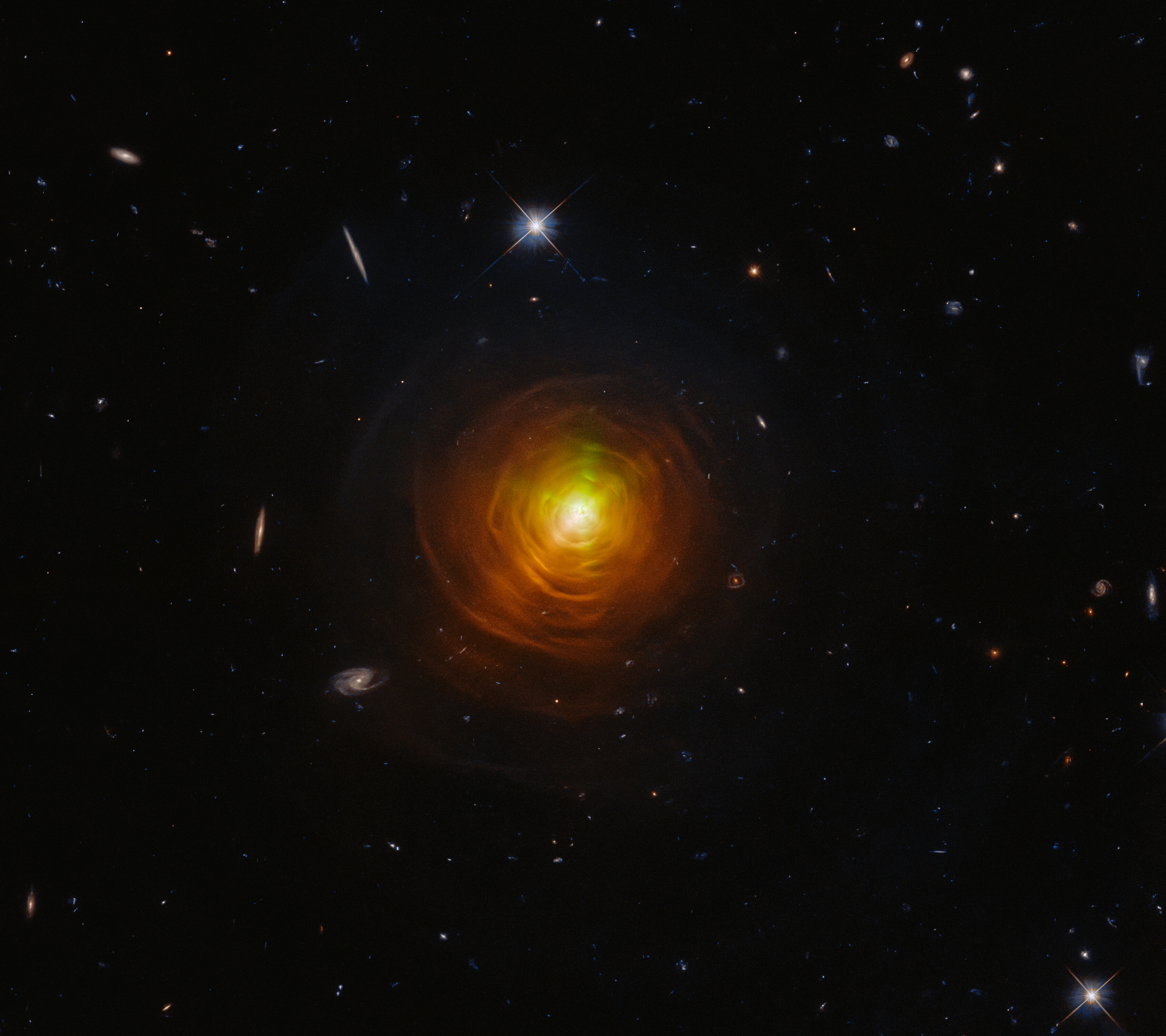
The carbon star CW Leonis. The visible shells of circumstellar material were ejected by the central star over thousands of years.

One of the richest sources for detecting interstellar molecules is Sagittarius B2 (Sgr B2), a giant molecular cloud near the centre of the Milky Way. About half of the molecules listed below were first found in Sgr B2, and many of the others have been subsequently detected there. Many of the largest molecules were first detected in another molecular cloud, TMC-1. A rich source of circumstellar molecules is CW Leonis (also known as IRC +10216), a nearby carbon star, where about 50 molecules have been identified. There is no clear boundary between interstellar and circumstellar media, so both are included in the tables below.

The discipline of astrochemistry includes understanding how these molecules form and explaining their abundances. The extremely low density of the interstellar medium is not conducive to the formation of molecules, making conventional gas-phase reactions between neutral species (atoms or molecules) inefficient. Many regions also have very low temperatures (typically 10 kelvin inside a molecular cloud), further reducing the reaction rates, or high ultraviolet radiation fields, which destroy molecules through photochemistry. Explaining the observed abundances of interstellar molecules requires calculating the balance between formation and destruction rates using gas-phase ion chemistry (often driven by cosmic rays), surface chemistry on cosmic dust, radiative transfer including interstellar extinction, and sophisticated reaction networks. The use of molecular lines to determine the physical properties of astronomical objects is known as molecular astrophysics.

== Molecules ==
The following tables list molecules that have been detected in the interstellar medium or circumstellar matter, grouped by the number of component atoms. Neutral molecules and their molecular ions are listed in separate columns; if there is no entry in the molecule column, only the ionized form has been detected. Designations (names of molecules) are those used in the scientific literature describing the detection; if none was given that field is left empty. Mass is listed in daltons. Deuterated molecules, which contain at least one deuterium (^{2}H) atom, have slightly different masses and are listed in a separate table. The total number of unique species, including distinct ionization states, is indicated in each section header.

Most of the molecules detected so far are organic. The only detected inorganic molecule with five or more atoms is SiH_{4}. Molecules larger than that all have at least one carbon atom, with no N−N or O−O bonds.

=== Diatomic (45) ===
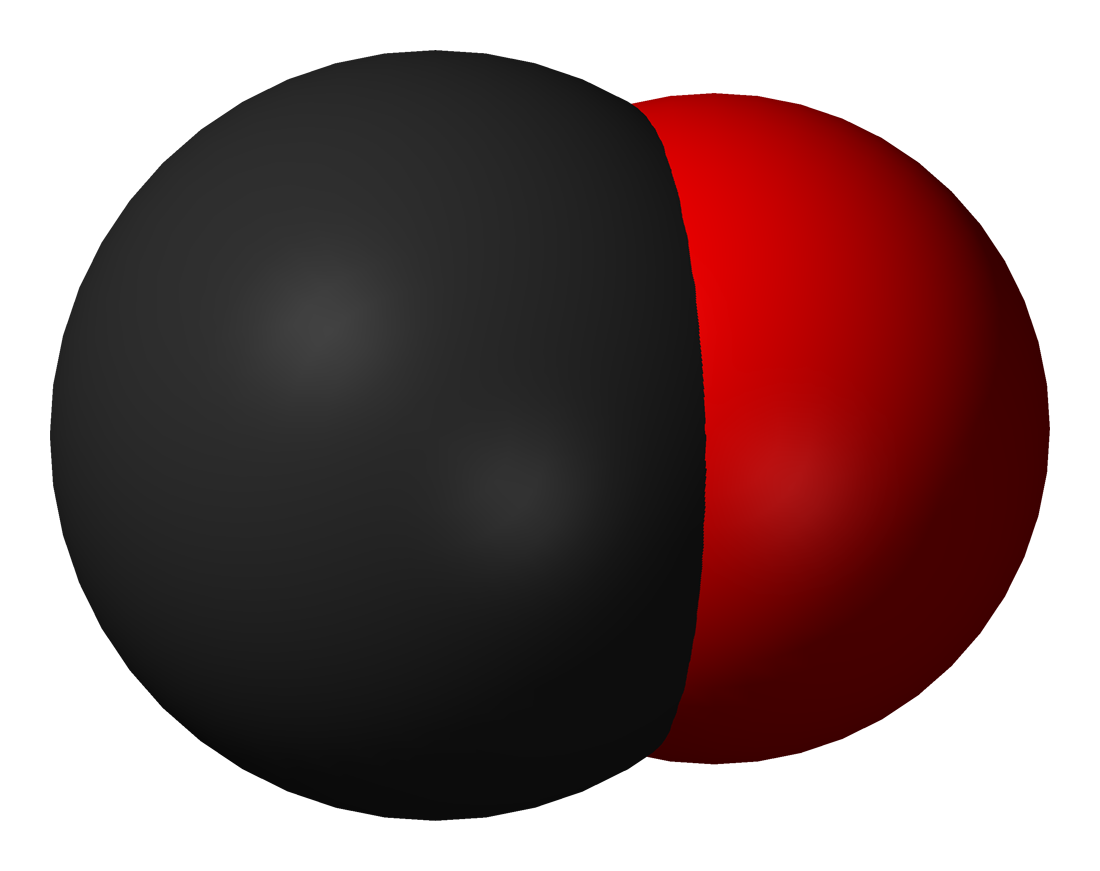
Carbon monoxide is frequently used to trace the distribution of mass in molecular clouds.

Molecule	Designation	Mass	Ions
AlCl	Aluminium monochloride	62.5	—
AlF	Aluminium monofluoride	46	—
AlO	Aluminium monoxide	43	—
—	Argonium	37 (Note: On Earth, the dominant isotope of argon is ^{40}Ar, so ArH^{+} would have a mass of 41 amu. However, the interstellar detection was of the ^{36}ArH^{+} isotopologue, which has a mass of 37 amu.)	ArH^{+}
C_{2}	Diatomic carbon	24	—
—	Fluoromethylidynium	31	CF^{+}
CH	Methylidyne radical	13	CH^{+}
CN	Cyano radical	26	CN^{+}, CN^{−}
CO	Carbon monoxide	28	CO^{+}
CP	Carbon monophosphide	43	—
CS	Carbon monosulfide	44	—
FeO	Iron(II) oxide	82	—
—	Helium hydride ion	5	HeH^{+}
H_{2}	Molecular hydrogen	2	—
HCl	Hydrogen chloride	36.5	HCl^{+}
HF	Hydrogen fluoride	20	—
HO	Hydroxyl radical	17	OH^{+}
KCl	Potassium chloride	75.5	—
NH	Imidogen radical	15	—
N_{2}	Molecular nitrogen	28	—
NO	Nitric oxide	30	NO^{+}
NS	Nitrogen sulfide	46	—
NaCl	Sodium chloride	58.5	—
—	Magnesium monohydride cation	25.3	MgH^{+}
O_{2}	Molecular oxygen	32	—
PN	Phosphorus mononitride	45	—
PO	Phosphorus monoxide	47	—
SH	Sulfur monohydride	33	SH^{+}
SO	Sulfur monoxide	48	SO^{+}
SiC	Carborundum	40	—
SiN	–	42	—
SiO	Silicon monoxide	44	—
NaS	Sodium sulfide	55	—
MgS	Magnesium sulfide	56	—
SiS	Silicon monosulfide	60	—
TiO	Titanium(II) oxide	64 (Note: Although titanium has several stable isotopes, only the ^{48}Ti^{16}O isotopologue was detected, which has a molecular mass of 64 amu.)	—

=== Triatomic (45) ===
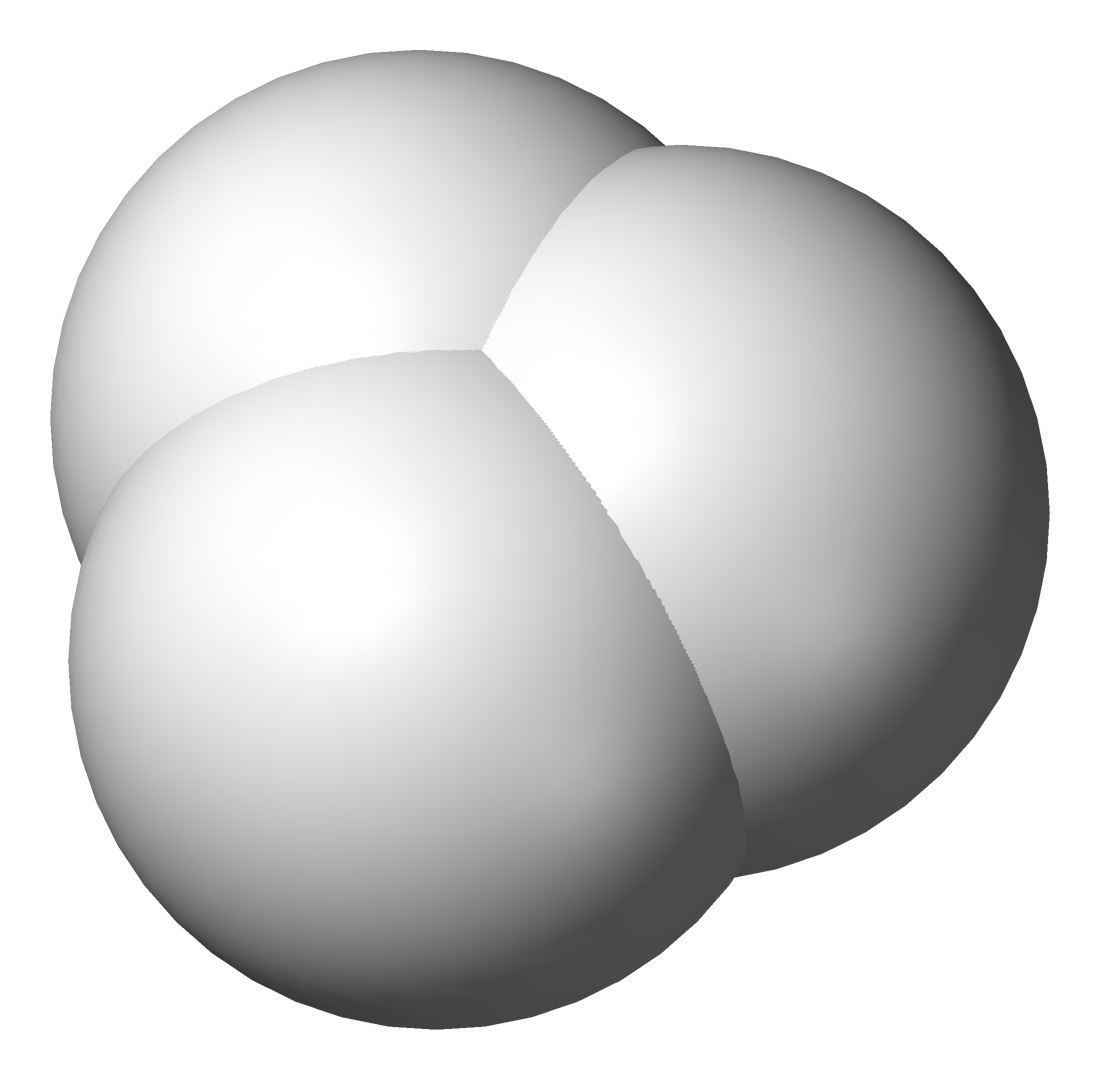
The H^{+}_{3} cation is one of the most abundant ions in the universe. It was first detected in 1993.

Molecule	Designation	Mass	Ions
AlNC	Aluminium isocyanide	53	—
AlOH	Aluminium hydroxide	44	—
C_{3}	Tricarbon	36	—
C_{2}H	Ethynyl radical	25	—
CCN	Cyanomethylidyne	38	—
C_{2}O	Dicarbon monoxide	40	—
C_{2}S	Thioxoethenylidene	56	—
C_{2}P	—	55	—
CO_{2}	Carbon dioxide	44	—
CaNC	Calcium(I) isocyanide	66	—
FeCN	Iron(I) cyanide	82	—
—	Protonated molecular hydrogen	3	H^{+}_{3}
H_{2}C	Methylene radical	14	—
—	Chloronium	37.5	H_{2}Cl^{+}
H_{2}O	Water	18	H_{2}O^{+}
HO_{2}	Hydroperoxyl	33	—
H_{2}S	Hydrogen sulfide	34	—
HCN	Hydrogen cyanide	27	—
HNC	Hydrogen isocyanide	27	—
HCO	Formyl radical	29	HCO^{+}
HCP	Phosphaethyne	44	—
HCS	Thioformyl	45	HCS^{+}
—	Diazenylium	29	HN^{+}_{2}
HNO	Nitroxyl	31	—
—	Isoformyl	29	HOC^{+}
HSC	Isothioformyl	45	—
KCN	Potassium cyanide	65	—
MgCN	Magnesium(I) cyanide	50	—
MgNC	Magnesium(I) isocyanide	50	—
NH_{2}	Amino radical	16	—
N_{2}O	Nitrous oxide	44	—
NaCN	Sodium cyanide	49	—
NaOH	Sodium hydroxide	40	—
OCS	Carbonyl sulfide	60	—
O_{3}	Ozone	48	—
SO_{2}	Sulfur dioxide	64	—
c-SiC_{2}	c-Silicon dicarbide	52	—
SiCSi	Disilicon carbide	68	—
SiCN	Silicon carbonitride	54	—
SiNC		54	—
CaC_{2}	Calcium dicarbide	64	—
TiO_{2}	Titanium dioxide	79.9	—

=== Four atoms (31) ===
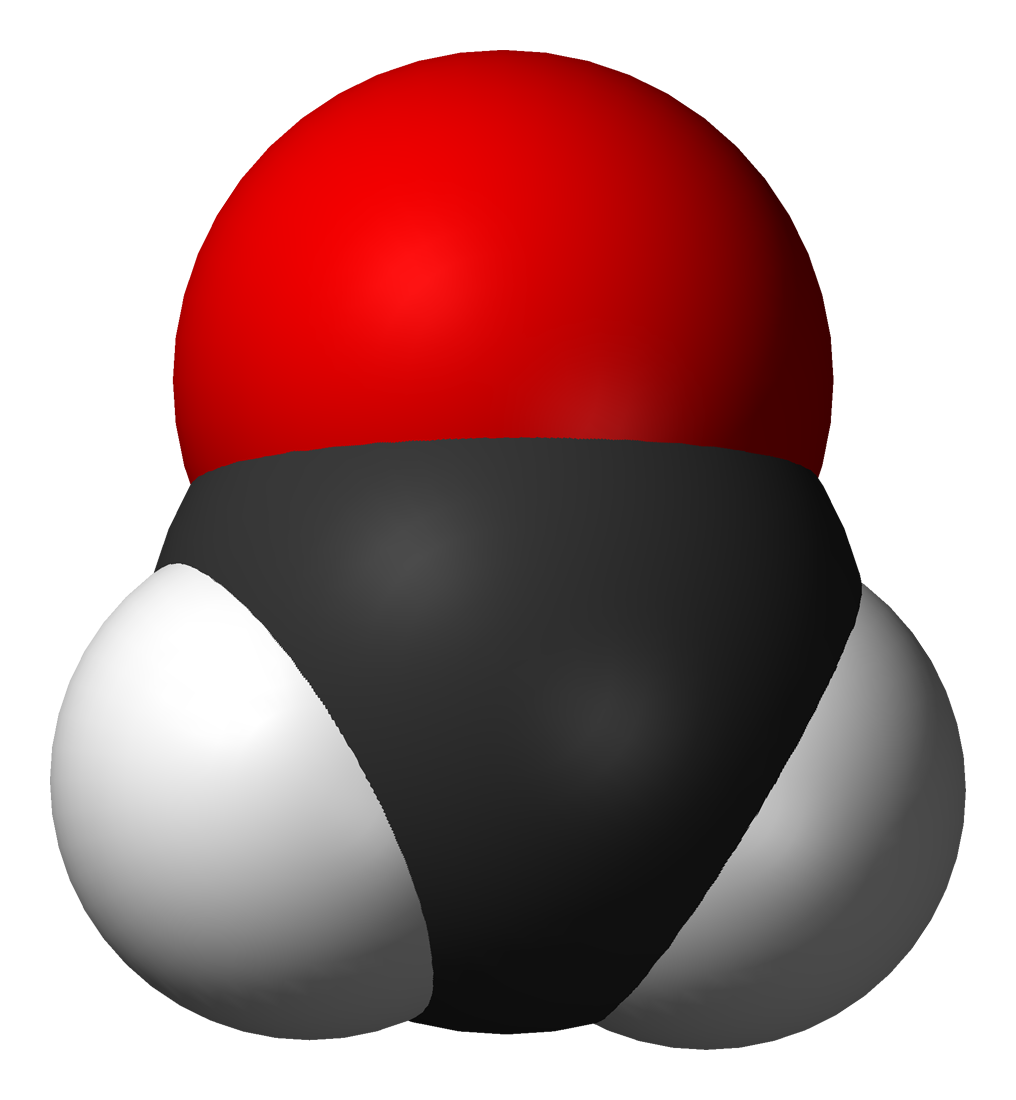
Formaldehyde is an organic molecule that is widely distributed in the interstellar medium.

Molecule	Designation	Mass	Ions
CH_{3}	Methyl radical	15	CH^{+}_{3}
l-C_{3}H	Propynylidyne	37	l-C_{3}H^{+}
c-C_{3}H	Cyclopropynylidyne	37	—
C_{3}N	Cyanoethynyl	50	C_{3}N^{−}
C_{3}O	Tricarbon monoxide	52	—
C_{3}S	Tricarbon sulfide	68	—
—	Hydronium	19	H_{3}O^{+}
C_{2}H_{2}	Acetylene	26	—
H_{2}CN	Methylene amidogen	28	H_{2}CN^{+}
H_{2}NC	Aminocarbyne	28	—
H_{2}CO	Formaldehyde	30	—
H_{2}CS	Thioformaldehyde	46	—
HCCN	—	39	—
HCCO	Ketenyl	41	—
—	Protonated hydrogen cyanide	28	HCNH^{+}
—	Protonated carbon dioxide	45	HOCO^{+}
HCNO	Fulminic acid	43	—
HOCN	Cyanic acid	43	—
CNCN	Isocyanogen	52	—
HOOH	Hydrogen peroxide	34	—
HNCO	Isocyanic acid	43	—
HNCN	Cyanomidyl radical	41	—
HNCS	Isothiocyanic acid	59	—
NH_{3}	Ammonia	17	—
HSCN	Thiocyanic acid	59	—
HNSO	Thionylimide	63	—
SiC_{3}	Silicon tricarbide	64	—
HMgNC	Hydromagnesium isocyanide	51.3	—
HNO_{2}	Nitrous acid	47	—

=== Five atoms (21) ===
Methane, the primary component of natural gas, has also been detected in molecular clouds.

Molecule	Designation	Mass	Ions
—	Ammonium ion	18	NH^{+}_{4}
CH_{4}	Methane	16	—
CH_{3}O	Methoxy radical	31	—
c-C_{3}H_{2}	Cyclopropenylidene	38	—
l-H_{2}C_{3}	Propadienylidene	38	—
H_{2}CCN	Cyanomethyl	40	—
H_{2}C_{2}O	Ketene	42	—
H_{2}CNH	Methylenimine	29	—
HNCNH	Carbodiimide	42	—
—	Protonated formaldehyde	31	H_{2}COH^{+}
C_{4}H	Butadiynyl	49	C_{4}H^{−}
HC_{3}N	Cyanoacetylene	51	—
HCC-NC	Isocyanoacetylene	51	—
HCOOH	Formic acid	46	—
NH_{2}CN	Cyanamide	42	—
NH_{2}OH	Hydroxylamine	37	—
—	Protonated cyanogen	53	NCCNH^{+}
HC(O)CN	Cyanoformaldehyde	55	—
C_{5}	Linear C_{5}	60	—
HCS_{2}H	dithioformic acid	78	—
SiC_{4}	Silicon-carbide cluster	92	—
SiH_{4}	Silane	32	—

=== Six atoms (16) ===
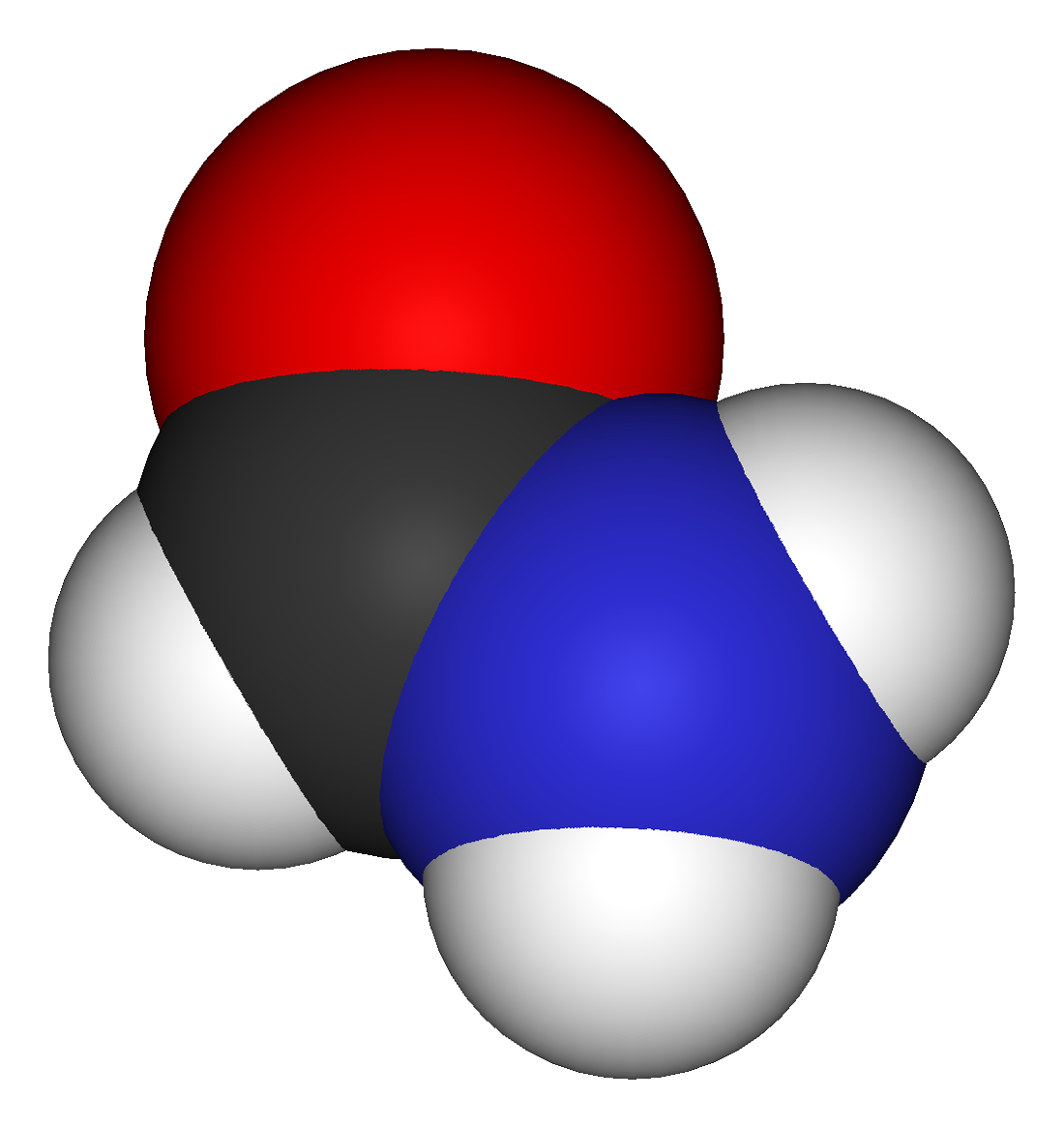
In the ISM, formamide (above) can combine with methylene to form acetamide.

Molecule	Designation	Mass	Ions
c-H_{2}C_{3}O	Cyclopropenone	54	—
E-HNCHCN	E-Cyanomethanimine	54	—
C_{2}H_{4}	Ethylene	28	—
CH_{3}CN	Acetonitrile	40	—
CH_{3}NC	Methyl isocyanide	40	—
CH_{3}OH	Methanol	32	—
CH_{3}SH	Methanethiol	48	—
l-H_{2}C_{4}	Diacetylene	50	—
—	Protonated cyanoacetylene	52	HC_{3}NH^{+}
HCONH_{2}	Formamide	44	—
HOCOOH	Carbonic acid		—
C_{5}H	Pentynylidyne	61	—
C_{5}N	Cyanobutadiynyl radical	74	—
HC_{2}CHO	Propynal	54	—
HC_{4}N	—	63	—
CH_{2}CNH	Ketenimine	40	—
C_{5}S	—	92	—

=== Seven atoms (16) ===
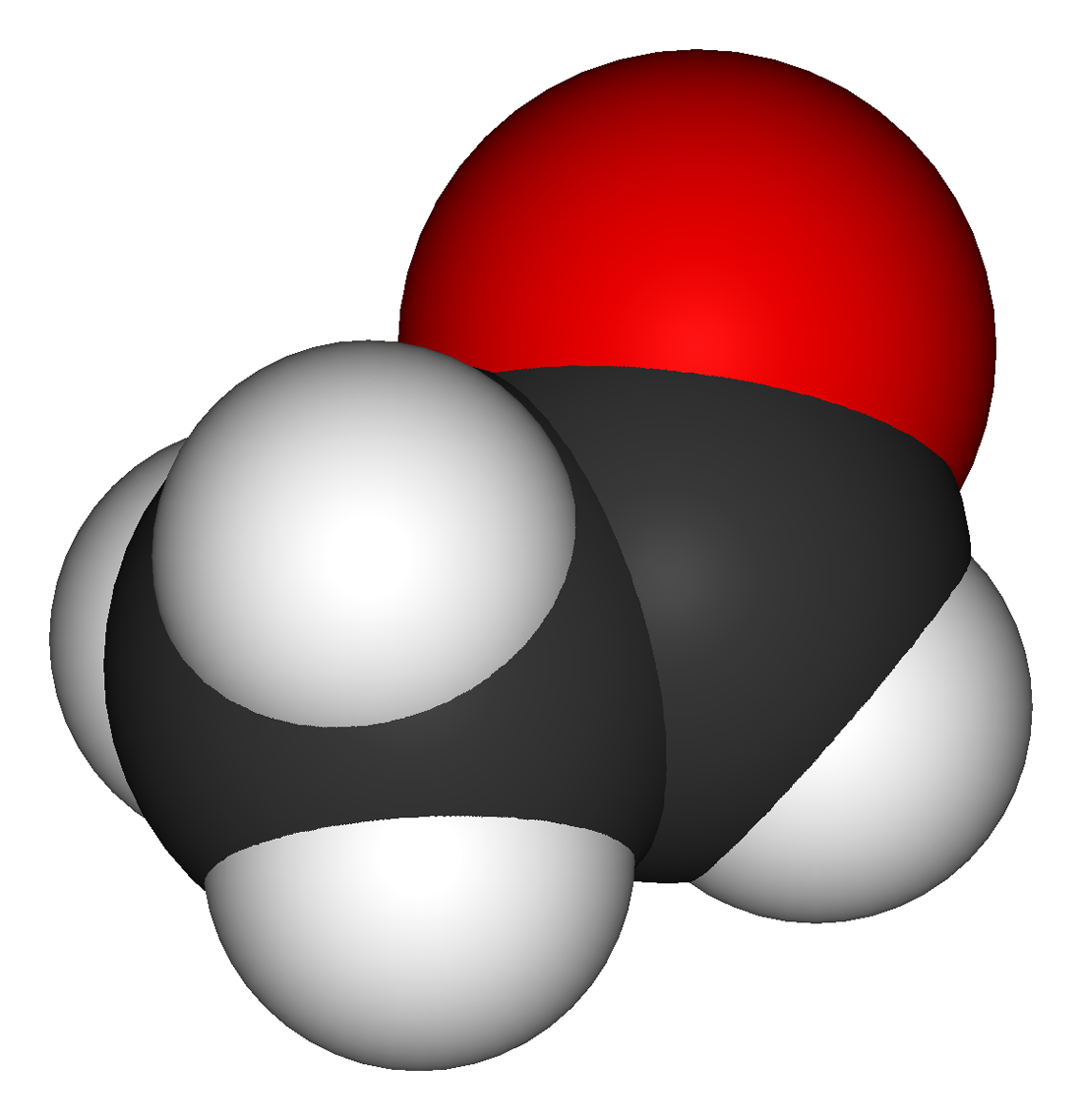
Acetaldehyde (above) and its isomers vinyl alcohol and ethylene oxide have all been detected in interstellar space.

Molecule	Designation	Mass	Ions
c-C_{2}H_{4}O	Ethylene oxide	44	—
CH_{3}C_{2}H	Methylacetylene	40	—
H_{3}CNH_{2}	Methylamine	31	—
CH_{2}CHCN	Acrylonitrile	53	—
HCCCHNH	Propargylimine	53	—
H_{2}CHCOH	Vinyl alcohol	44	—
C_{6}H	Hexatriynyl radical	73	C_{6}H^{−}
HC_{4}CN	Cyanodiacetylene	75	—
HC_{4}NC	Isocyanodiacetylene	75	—
HC_{5}O	—	77	—
CH_{3}CHO	Acetaldehyde	44	—
CH_{3}CHS	Thioacetaldehyde	60	—
CH_{3}NCO	Methyl isocyanate	57	—
HOCH_{2}CN	Glycolonitrile	57	—
HC_{3}HCN	1-cyano propargyl radical	64	—
CH_{2}C_{3}N	3-cyano propargyl radical	64	—

=== Eight atoms (14) ===
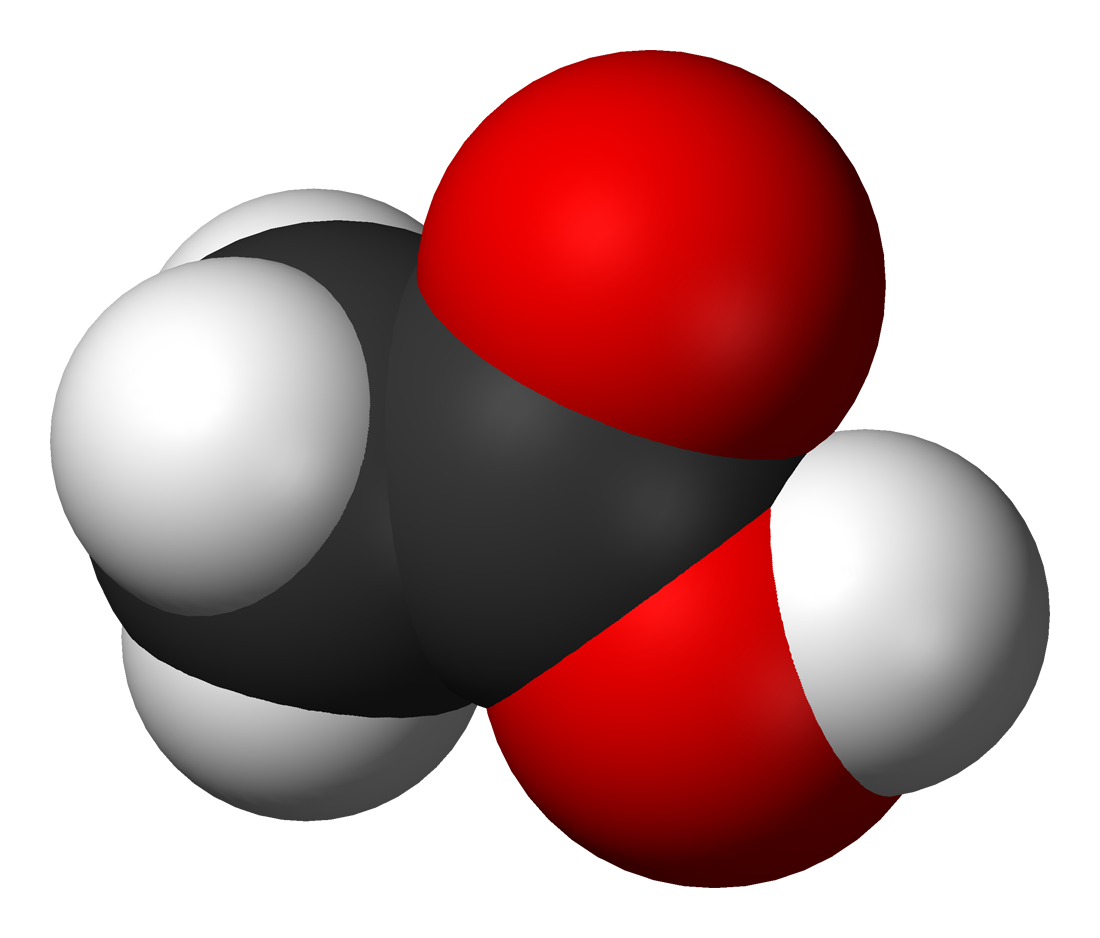
The radio signature of acetic acid, a compound found in vinegar, was confirmed in 1997.

Molecule	Designation	Mass
H_{3}CC_{2}CN	Methylcyanoacetylene	65
HC_{3}H_{2}CN	Propargyl cyanide	65
H_{2}COHCHO	Glycolaldehyde	60
(CHOH)_{2}	1,2-ethenediol	60
HCOOCH_{3}	Methyl formate	60
CH_{3}COOH	Acetic acid	60
H_{2}C_{6}	Hexapentaenylidene	74
CH_{2}CHCHO	Propenal	56
CH_{2}CCHCN	Cyanoallene	65
CH_{3}CHNH	Ethanimine	43
C_{2}H_{3}NH_{2}	Vinylamine	43
C_{7}H	Heptatrienyl radical	85
NH_{2}CH_{2}CN	Aminoacetonitrile	56
(NH_{2})_{2}CO	Urea	60

=== Nine atoms (11) ===
Molecule	Designation	Mass	Ions
CH_{3}C_{4}H	Methyldiacetylene	64	—
CH_{3}OCH_{3}	Dimethyl ether	46	—
CH_{3}CH_{2}CN	Propionitrile	55	—
CH_{3}CONH_{2}	Acetamide	59	—
CH_{3}CH_{2}OH	Ethanol	46	—
C_{8}H	Octatetraynyl radical	97	C_{8}H^{−}
HC_{7}N	Cyanohexatriyne or Cyanotriacetylene	99	—
CH_{3}CHCH_{2}	Propylene (propene)	42	—
CH_{3}CH_{2}SH	Ethyl mercaptan	62	—
CH_{3}SCH_{3}	Dimethyl sulfide	62	—
CH_{3}NHCHO	N-methylformamide	59	—

=== Ten or more atoms (30) ===
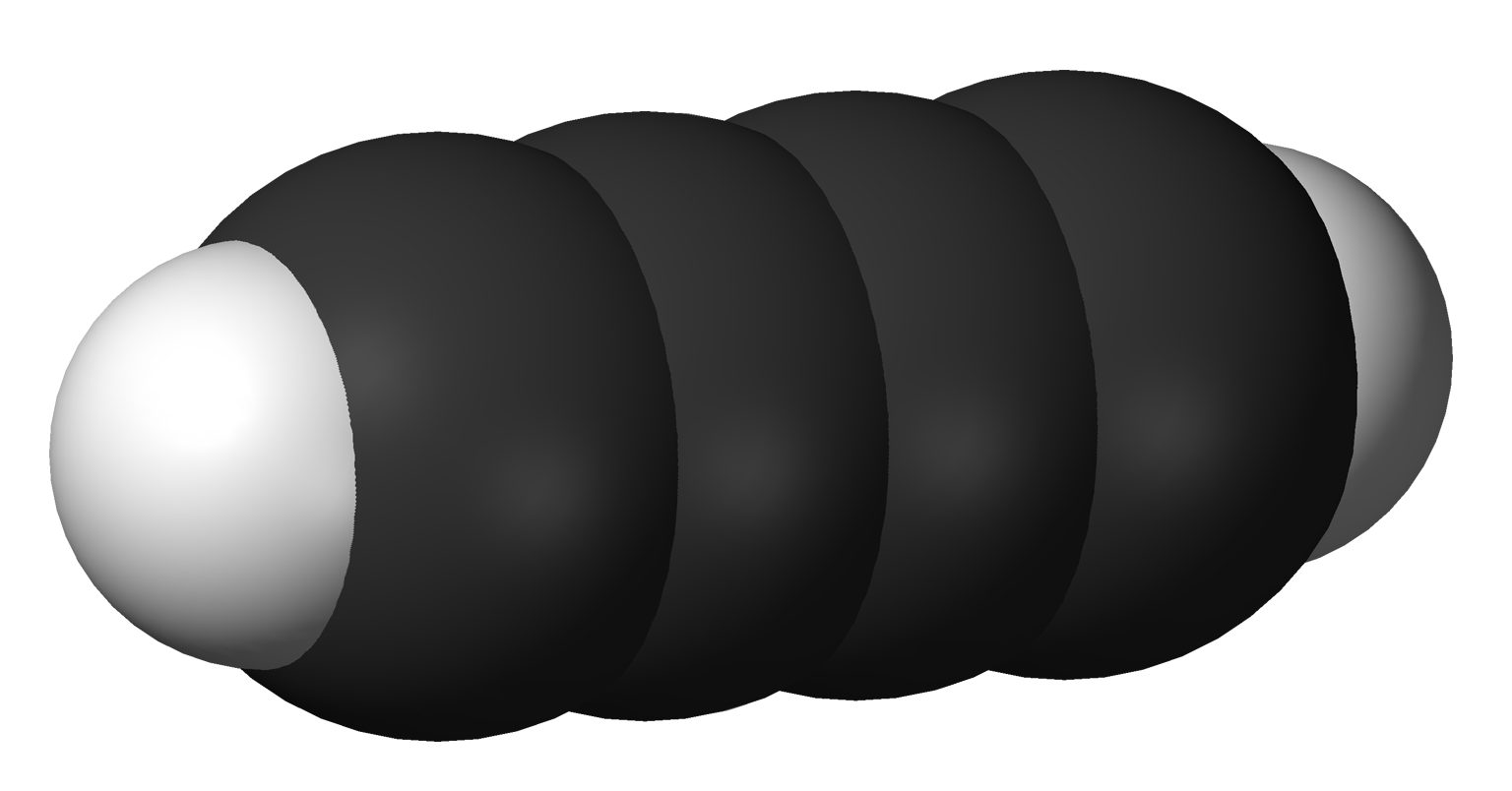
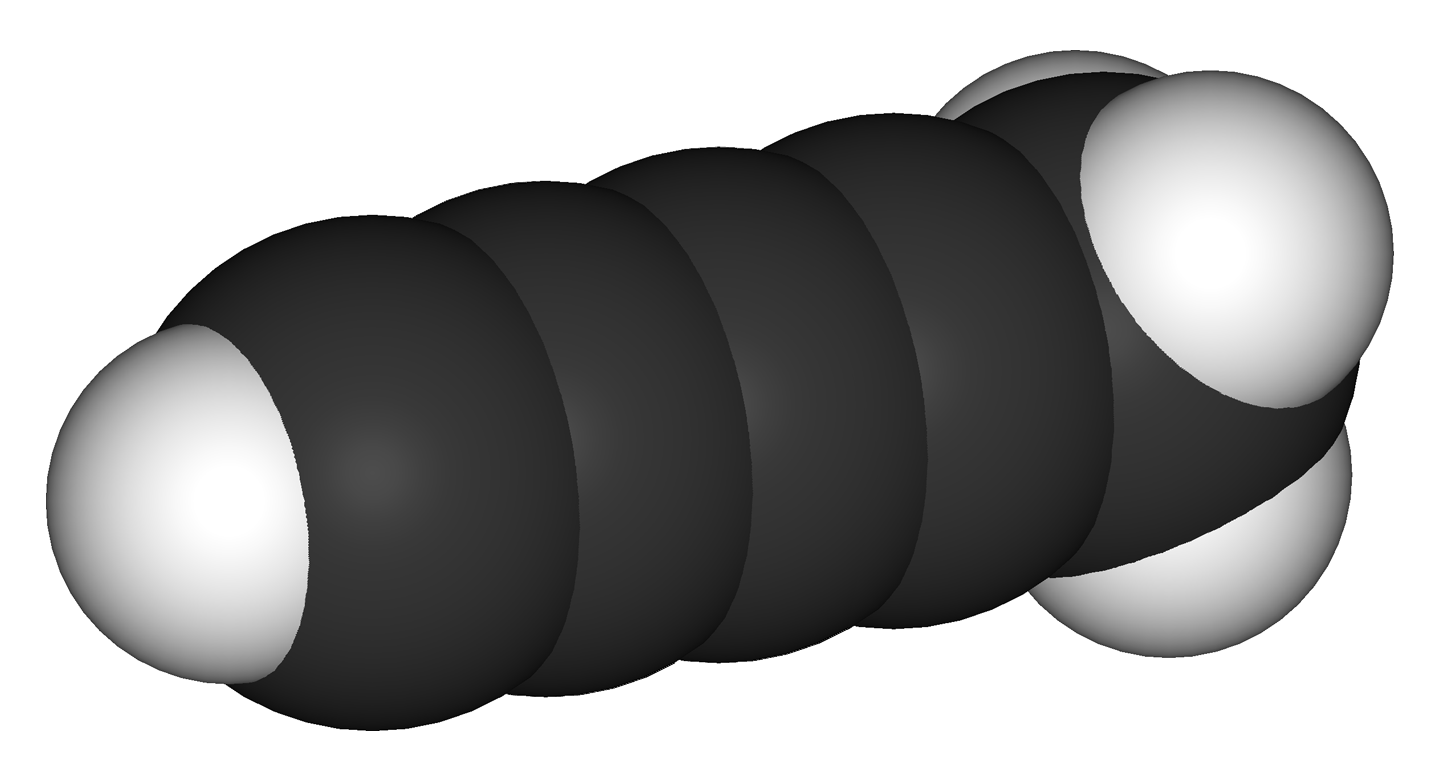
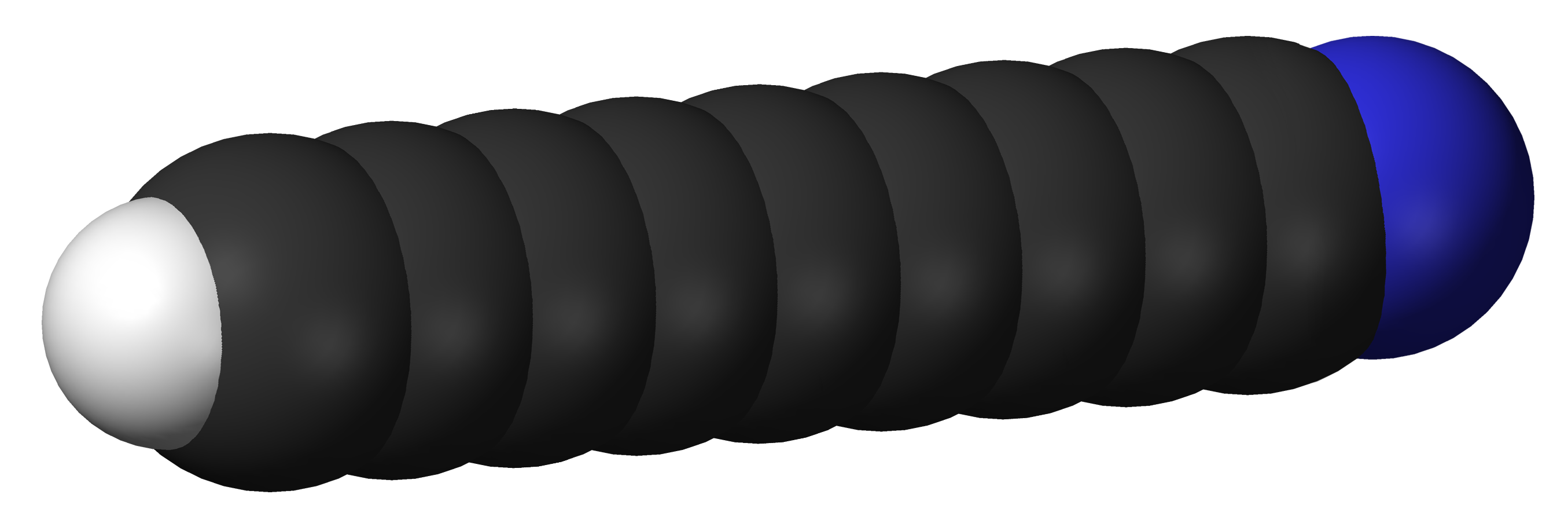
A number of polyyne-derived chemicals are among the heaviest molecules found in the interstellar medium.

Atoms	Molecule	Designation	Mass	Ions
10	(CH_{3})_{2}CO	Acetone	58	—
10	(CH_{2}OH)_{2}	Ethylene glycol	62	—
10	CH_{3}CH_{2}CHO	Propanal	58	—
10	CH_{3}OCH_{2}OH	Methoxymethanol	62	—
10	CH_{3}C_{5}N	Methylcyanodiacetylene	89	—
10	CH_{3}CHCH_{2}O	Propylene oxide	58	—
11	NH_{2}CH_{2}CH_{2}OH	Ethanolamine	61	—
11	HC_{8}CN	Cyanotetraacetylene	123	—
11	C_{2}H_{5}OCHO	Ethyl formate	74	—
11	CH_{3}COOCH_{3}	Methyl acetate	74	—
11	CH_{3}C_{6}H	Methyltriacetylene	88	—
12	C_{6}H_{6}	Benzene	78	—
12	C_{3}H_{7}CN	n-Propyl cyanide	69	—
12	(CH_{3})_{2}CHCN	iso-Propyl cyanide	69	—
13	CH_{3}OCH_{2}CH_{2}OH	2-methoxyethanol	76	—
13	C_{6}H_{5}CN	Benzonitrile	104	—
13	C_{6}H_{6}S	2,5-cyclohexadien-1-thione	110	—
13	HC_{10}CN	Cyanopentaacetylene	147	—
14	C_{4}H_{8}O_{4}	Erythrulose	120	—
17	C_{9}H_{8}	Indene	116	—
19	C_{10}H_{7}CN	1-cyanonaphthalene	153	—
19	C_{10}H_{7}CN	2-cyanonaphthalene	153	—
21	C_{12}H_{7}CN	1-cyanoacenaphtylene	177	—
21	C_{12}H_{7}CN	5-cyanoacenaphtylene	177	—
27	C_{16}H_{9}CN	1-cyanopyrene	227	—
27	C_{16}H_{9}CN	2-cyanopyrene	227	—
27	C_{16}H_{9}CN	4-cyanopyrene	227	—
37	C_{24}H_{11}CN	cyanocoronene	325	—
60	C_{60}	Buckminsterfullerene (C_{60} fullerene)	720	C^{+}_{60}
70	C_{70}	C_{70} fullerene	840	—

== Deuterated molecules (22) ==
These molecules all contain one or more deuterium atoms, a heavier isotope of hydrogen.

Atoms	Molecule	Designation
2	HD	Hydrogen deuteride
3	H_{2}D^{+}, HD^{+}_{2}	Trihydrogen cation
3	HDO	deuterated water
3	D_{2}O	heavy water
3	DCN	Hydrogen cyanide
3	DCO	Formyl radical
3	DNC	Hydrogen isocyanide
3	N_{2}D^{+}	—
3	NHD, ND_{2}	Amidogen
4	NH_{2}D, NHD_{2}, ND_{3}	Ammonia
4	HDCO, D_{2}CO	Formaldehyde
4	DNCO	Isocyanic acid
5	NH_{3}D^{+}	Ammonium ion
6	NH_{2}CDO; NHDCHO	Formamide
7	CH_{2}DCCH, CH_{3}CCD	Methylacetylene

== Unconfirmed (16) ==
Evidence for the existence of the following molecules has been reported in the scientific literature, but the detections either are described as tentative by the authors, or have been challenged by other researchers. They await independent confirmation.

Atoms	Molecule	Designation
2	SiH	Silylidine
2	CaO	Calcium oxide
4	PH_{3}	Phosphine
4	MgCCH	Magnesium monoacetylide
4	NCCP	Cyanophosphaethyne
5	H_{2}NCO^{+}	—
6	SiH_{3}CN	Silyl cyanide
10	H_{2}NCH_{2}COOH	Glycine
10	C_{2}H_{5}NH_{2}	Ethylamine
12	CO(CH_{2}OH)_{2}	Dihydroxyacetone
12	C_{2}H_{5}OCH_{3}	Ethyl methyl ether
18	C_{10}H^{+}_{8}	Naphthalene cation
24	C_{24}	Graphene
24	C_{14}H_{10}	Anthracene
26	C_{16}H_{10}	Pyrene
27	C_{11}H_{12}N_{2}O_{2}	Tryptophan

== See also ==
- Astrochemistry
- Cosmic dust
- Diffuse interstellar band
- Lists of molecules
- Molecular astrophysics
- Molecular spectroscopy
- Molecules in stars
- Polycyclic aromatic hydrocarbon (PAH)
- Tholin
