= Cyanopolyyne =

Family of organic compounds

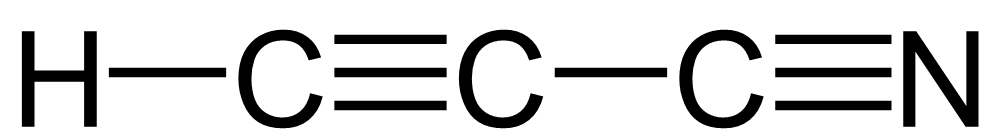
Chemical structure of cyanoacetylene, the simplest cyanopolyyne

In organic chemistry, cyanopolyynes are a family of organic compounds with the chemical formula HC_{n}N (n = 3,5,7,...) and the structural formula H−[C≡C−]_{n}C≡N (n = 1,2,3,...). Structurally, they are polyynes with a cyano group (−C≡N) covalently bonded to one of the terminal acetylene units (H−C≡C).

A rarely seen group of molecules both due to the difficulty in production and the unstable nature of the paired groups, the cyanopolyynes have been observed as a major organic component in interstellar clouds. This is believed to be due to the hydrogen scarcity of some of these clouds. Interference with hydrogen is one of the reasons for the molecule's instability due to the energetically favorable dissociation back into hydrogen cyanide and acetylene.

Cyanopolyynes were first discovered in interstellar molecular clouds in 1971 using millimeter wave and microwave telescopes. Since then many higher weight cyanopolyynes such as HC_{7}N and HC_{11}N have been discovered, although some of these identifications have been disputed. Other derivatives such as methylcyanoacetylene CH_{3}C_{3}N and ethylcyanoacetylene CH_{3}CH_{2}C_{3}N have been observed as well. The simplest example is cyanoacetylene, H−C≡C−C≡N. Cyanoacetylene is more common on Earth and it is believed to be the initial reagent for most of the photocatalyzed formation of the interstellar cyanopolyynes. Cyanoacetylene is one of the molecules that was produced in the Miller–Urey experiment and is expected to be found in carbon-rich environments.

Identification is made through comparison of experimental spectrum with spectrum gathered from the telescope. This is commonly done with measurement of the rotational constant, the energy of the rotational transitions, or a measurement of the dissociation energy. These spectra can either be generated ab initio from a computational chemistry program or, such as with the more stable cyanoacetylene, by direct measurement of the spectra in an experiment. Once the spectra are generated, the telescope can scan within certain frequencies for the desired molecules. Quantification can be accomplished as well to determine the density of the compounds in the cloud.

== Hypothesized formation ==
The formation of cyanopolyynes in interstellar clouds is time-dependent. The formation of cyanopolyyne was studied and the abundances calculated in the dark cloud TMC-1. In the early days of the TMC-1, the governing reactions were ion–molecule reactions. During this time cyanoacetylene, HC_{3}N, formed through a series of ion-neutral reactions, with the final chemical reaction being:

C_{3}H_{2} + N → HC_{3}N + H

However, for time after 10,000 years the dominant reactions were neutral–neutral reactions and two reaction mechanisms for the formation of cyanopolyynes became possible.

1. HCN + C_{2}H_{2} → HC_{3}N
2. C_{n}H_{2} + CN → HC_{n+1} + H for n = 4, 6, 8

The reaction mechanism that occurs in the present day depends on the environment of the cloud. For the first reaction mechanism to take place, the cloud must contain an abundance of C_{2}H. The second reaction mechanism occurs if there is an abundance of C_{2}H_{2}. C_{2}H and C_{2}H_{2} exist in different conditions, so the formation of cyanopolyynes relies on high accessibility to either molecule. The calculations by Winstanley show that photoionization and dissociation reactions play a profound role in the abundances of cyanopolyynes after about 1 million years. However, the fractional abundances of cyanopolyyne are less affected by changes in radiation field intensity past time 1 million years because the prevailing neutral-neutral reactions surpass the effects of photoreactions.

== Detection in interstellar medium ==
Cyanopolyynes are relatively common in interstellar clouds, where they were first detected in 1971. As with many other molecules the cyanopolyynes are detected with a spectrometer which records the quantum energy levels of the electrons within the atoms. This measurement is done with a source of light which passes through the desired molecule. The light interacts with the molecule and can either absorb the light or reflect it, as not all light behaves the same way. This separates the light into a spectrum with alterations due to the molecule in question. This spectrum is recorded by a computer which is able to determine which wavelengths of the spectrum have been altered in some way. With the wide range of light affected the wavelengths can be determined by looking for spikes in the spectrum. The detection process usually happens within the outer ranges of the electromagnetic spectrum, usually in infrared or radio waves.

The spectrum is able to show the energy of the rotational state due to the wavelengths that are absorbed by the molecule; using these rotational transitions the energy level of each electron can be shown to determine the identity of the molecule. Rotational transitions can be determined by this equation:

$$V(J) = 2B_0 J - 4D_0 J^3$$

where

B_{0} is the rotational distortion constant for the vibrational ground state
D_{0} is the centrifugal distortion constant for the vibrational ground state
J is the total angular momentum quantum number

This shows that the rotational distortion of an atom is related to the vibrational frequency of the molecule in question. With this ability to detect the cyanopolyynes these molecules have been recorded in several places around the galaxy. Such places include the atmosphere on Titan and the gas clouds that are within nebulae and the confines of dying stars.

Species as large as HC_{9}N were detected in Taurus Molecular Cloud 1, where they are believed to be formed by reaction of atomic nitrogen with hydrocarbons. For a while, HC_{11}N held the record as the largest molecule detected in interstellar space, but its identification was challenged.

== See also ==
- Diacetylene, H−C≡C−C≡C−H
