= Dark Wolf Nebula =

Dark nebula in the constellation Scorpius

Nebula
- Dark nebula
- Image captured of the Dark Wolf Nebula by the VLT Survey Telescope (VST) at ESO's Paranal Observatory in Chile.

Observation data: J2000 epoch
- Right ascension: 16^{h} 54^{m} 10^{s}
- Declination: −43° 23′ 10″
- Distance: 5,300 ly
- Apparent dimensions (V): 60 x 60 arcmins
- Constellation: Scorpius
- Designations: Fenrir Nebula, SL 17

The Dark Wolf Nebula (also known as the Fenrir Nebula or SL 17) is a dark nebula located around 5,300 light years away in the constellation of Scorpius. It lies within the larger H II region Gum 55 (RCW 113). The "dark wolf" name derives from the wolf-like appearance of darker parts of the nebula.

== Discovery ==
The Dark Wolf Nebula was catalogued as SL 17 by Swedish astronomers A. Sandqvist and K.P. Lindroos in 1976 during there study of interstellar formaldehyde in the southern dark nebulae.

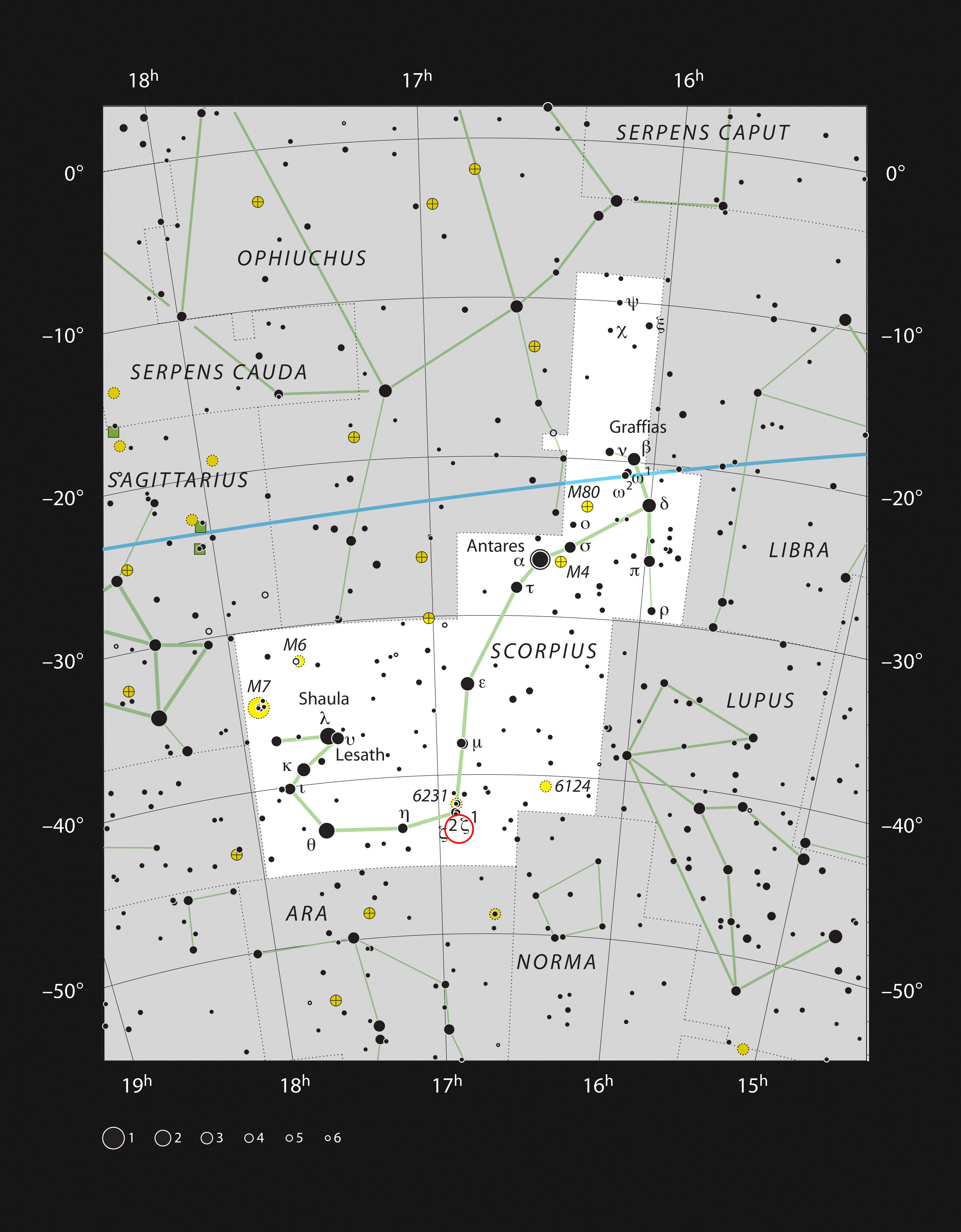
Location of Dark Wolf Nebula

== See also ==
- Gum catalog
- RCW Catalogue
