= Propiolaldehyde =

Names
- Preferred IUPAC name Prop-2-ynal
- Other names Propynal; Propiolic aldehyde

Identifiers
| CAS Number | 624-67-9 |
| 3D model (JSmol) | Interactive image |
| Beilstein Reference | 1098318 |
| ChEBI | CHEBI:27976 |
| ChEMBL | ChEMBL722 |
| ChemSpider | 11721 |
| ECHA InfoCard | 100.009.871 |
| EC Number | 210-857-4 |
| KEGG | C05985 |
| PubChem CID | 12222 |
| UNII | SJ8A65XF7N |
| CompTox Dashboard (EPA) | DTXSID3060790 |
- InChI: InChI=1S/C3H2O/c1-2-3-4/h1,3H Key: IJNJLGFTSIAHEA-UHFFFAOYSA-N
- SMILES: C#CC=O

Properties
| Chemical formula | C_{3}H_{2}O |
| Molar mass | 54.048 g·mol^{−1} |
| Appearance | colorless liquid |
| Density | 0.9152 g/cm^{3} |
| Boiling point | 54–57 °C (129–135 °F; 327–330 K) |

Hazards
- GHS labelling
| Pictograms | (GHS02: Flammable) (GHS05: Corrosive) (GHS06: Toxic) (GHS07: Exclamation mark) |
| Signal word | Danger |
| Hazard statements | H225, H226, H300, H315, H317, H318, H319, H330, H335 |
| Precautionary statements | P210, P233, P240, P241, P242, P243, P260, P264, P264+P265, P270, P271, P272, P280, P284, P301+P316, P302+P352, P303+P361+P353, P304+P340, P305+P351+P338, P305+P354+P338, P316, P317, P319, P320, P321, P330, P333+P317, P337+P317, P362+P364, P370+P378, P403+P233, P403+P235, P405, P501 |
- Except where otherwise noted, data are given for materials in their standard state (at 25 °C [77 °F], 100 kPa). Infobox references

Propiolaldehyde is an organic compound with molecular formula HC_{2}CHO. It is the simplest chemical compound containing both alkyne and aldehyde functional groups. It is a colorless liquid with explosive properties.

== Reactions ==
The compound exhibits reactions expected for an electrophilic alkynyl aldehyde. It is a dienophile and a good Michael acceptor. Grignard reagents add to the carbonyl center. Its explosive properties are attributed to the exothermicity of its polymerization.

== Preparation ==
Its acetal can be prepared from acrolein.

== Occurrence in interstellar medium ==
Propynal has been observed in the interstellar medium. It is hypothesized to be formed from a carbon monoxide-acetylene complex. Another possible pathway is through the reaction of propynylidyne (C_{3}H) with water.

== Hazards ==
The compound is explosive, possibly because it tends to polymerize.

== See also ==
- Acrolein
- Propiolic acid
