= Cyanoacetylene =

Organic compound (HC≡C–C≡N)

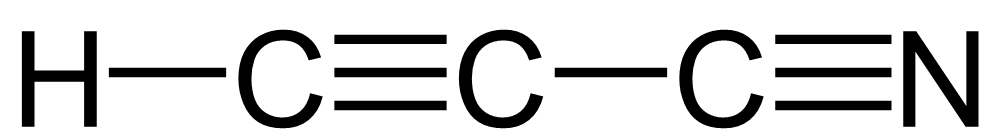

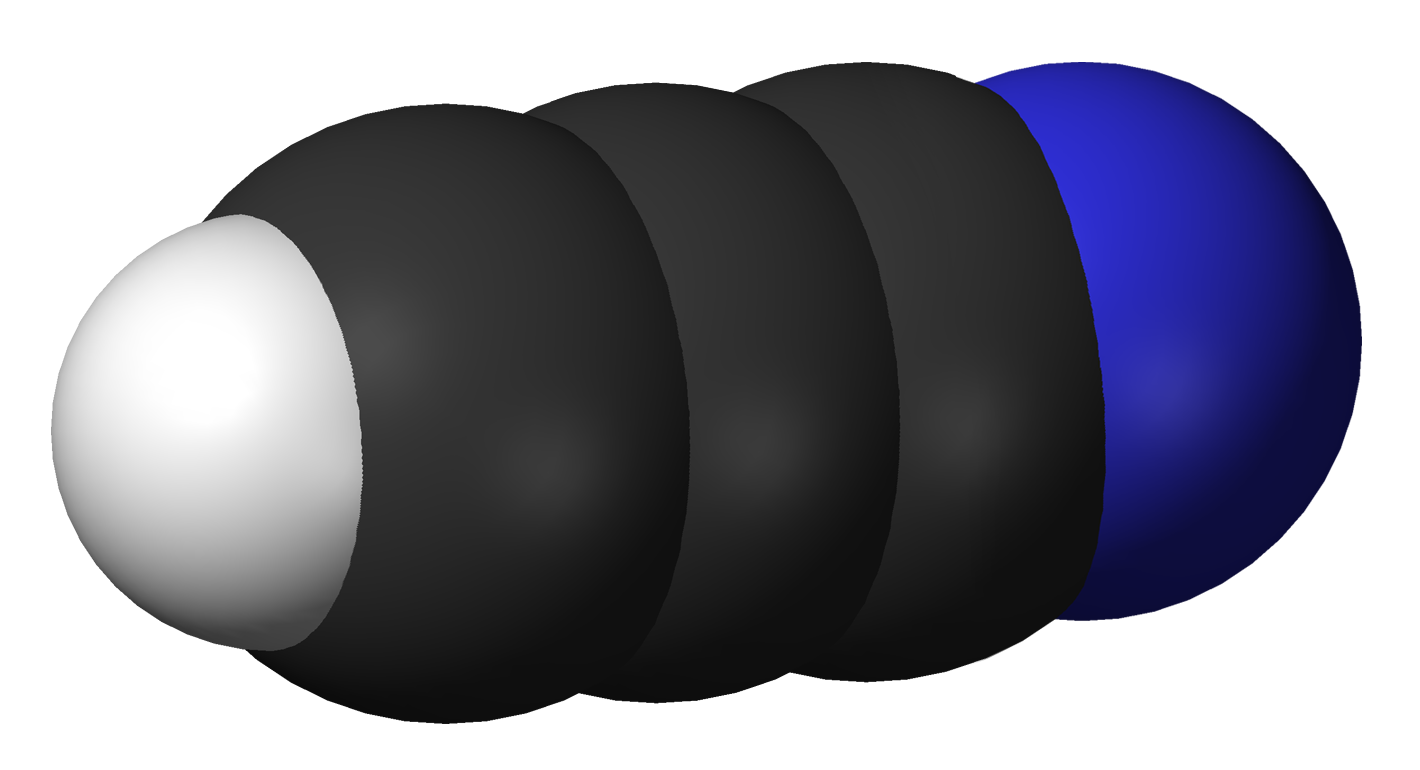

Names
- Preferred IUPAC name Prop-2-ynenitrile
- Other names: Propiolonitrile; Cyanoethyne; Monocyanoacetylene; 2-Propynenitrile

Identifiers
CAS Number	1070-71-9
3D model (JSmol)	Interactive image
ChemSpider	13436
ECHA InfoCard	100.313.512
PubChem CID	14055
UNII	0TF7QM91EF
CompTox Dashboard (EPA)	DTXSID40147867
- InChI: InChI=1S/C3HN/c1-2-3-4/h1H Key: LNDJVIYUJOJFSO-UHFFFAOYSA-N; InChI=1/C3HN/c1-2-3-4/h1H Key: LNDJVIYUJOJFSO-UHFFFAOYAB
- SMILES: C#CC#N

Properties
Chemical formula	C_{3}HN
Molar mass	51.048 g·mol^{−1}
Appearance	Colorless liquid
Melting point	5 °C (41 °F; 278 K)
Boiling point	42.5 °C (108.5 °F; 315.6 K)
- Except where otherwise noted, data are given for materials in their standard state (at 25 °C [77 °F], 100 kPa). verify (what is ?) Infobox references

Cyanoacetylene is an organic compound with the formula C_{3}HN or H−C≡C−C≡N. It is the simplest cyanopolyyne. Cyanoacetylene has been detected by spectroscopic methods in interstellar clouds, in the coma of comet Hale–Bopp and in the atmosphere of Saturn's moon Titan, where it sometimes forms expansive fog-like clouds.

Cyanoacetylene is one of the molecules that was produced in the Miller–Urey experiment.

H−C≡C−H + H−C≡N → H−C≡C−C≡N + H_{2}

Nickel carbonyl catalyzes cyanoacetylene carboalkoxylation to cyanoacrylate esters.

== See also ==
- Dicyanoacetylene, N≡C−C≡C−C≡N
- Diacetylene, H−C≡C−C≡C−H
- Cyanogen, N≡C−C≡N
- Hydrocyanic acid, H−C≡N
- Polyyne, R−(C≡C)_{n}−R
