= Ethynyl radical =

Hydrocarbon compound

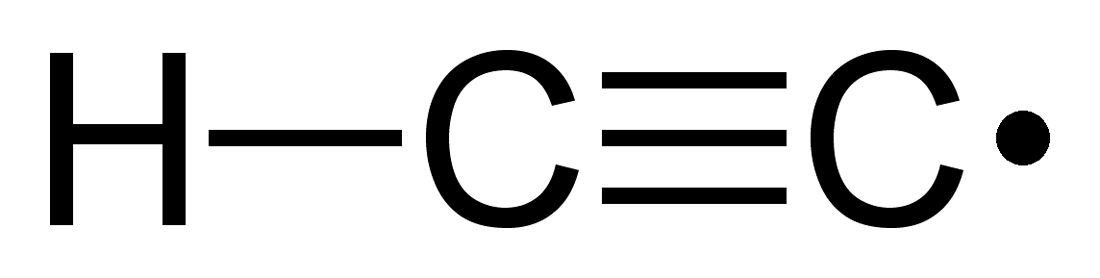
Structural formula of the ethynyl radical
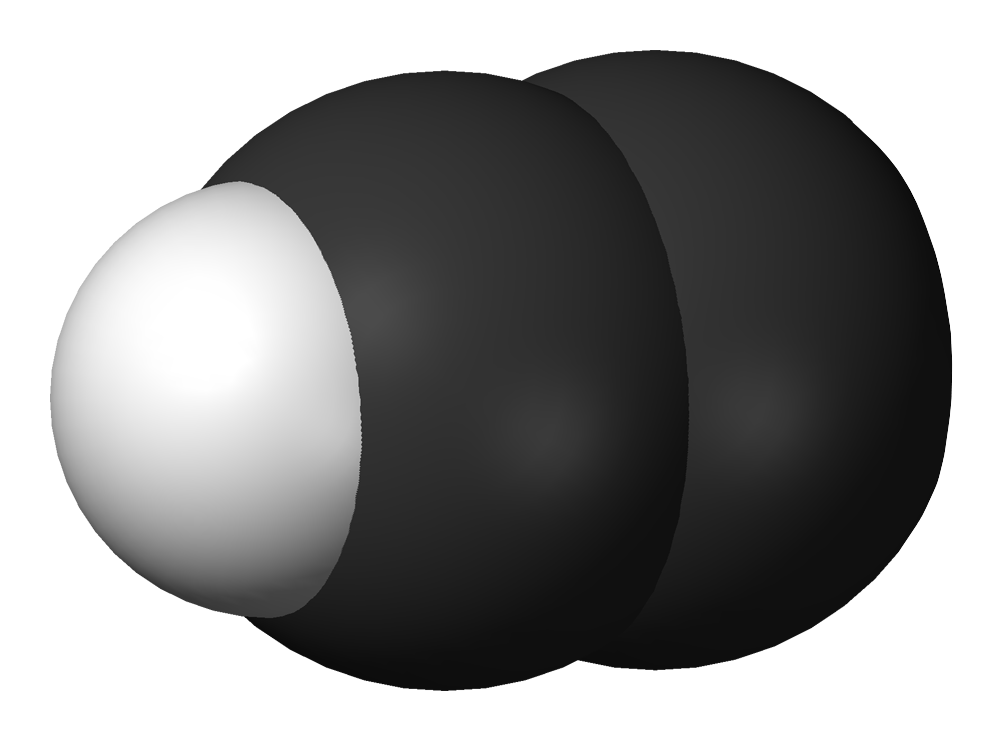
Spacefill model of ethynyl radical

Names
- Preferred IUPAC name Ethynyl

Identifiers
CAS Number	2122-48-7
3D model (JSmol)	Interactive image; Interactive image
Beilstein Reference	1814004
ChEBI	CHEBI:30085
ChemSpider	109883
Gmelin Reference	48916
PubChem CID	123271
CompTox Dashboard (EPA)	DTXSID40175448
- InChI: InChI=1S/C2H/c1-2/h1H Key: XEHVFKKSDRMODV-UHFFFAOYSA-N; InChI=1/C2H/c1-2/h1H Key: XEHVFKKSDRMODV-UHFFFAOYAZ
- SMILES: C#[C]; [C]#C

Properties
Chemical formula	C_{2}H
Molar mass	25.030 g·mol^{−1}
- Except where otherwise noted, data are given for materials in their standard state (at 25 °C [77 °F], 100 kPa). verify (what is ?) Infobox references

The ethynyl radical (systematically named λ^{3}-ethyne and hydridodicarbon(C—C)) is an organic compound with the chemical formula C≡CH (also written [CCH] or C_{2}H). It is a simple molecule that does not occur naturally on Earth but is abundant in the interstellar medium. It was first observed by electron spin resonance isolated in a solid argon matrix at liquid helium temperatures in 1963 by Cochran and coworkers at the Johns Hopkins Applied Physics Laboratory. It was first observed in the gas phase by Tucker and coworkers in November 1973 toward the Orion Nebula, using the NRAO 11-meter radio telescope. It has since been detected in a large variety of interstellar environments, including dense molecular clouds, bok globules, star forming regions, the shells around carbon-rich evolved stars, and even in other galaxies.

== Astronomical importance ==
Observations of C_{2}H can yield a large number of insights into the chemical and physical conditions where it is located. First, the relative abundance of ethynyl is an indication of the carbon-richness of its environment (as opposed to oxygen, which provides an important destruction mechanism). Since there are typically insufficient quantities of C_{2}H along a line of sight to make emission or absorption lines optically thick, derived column densities can be relatively accurate (as opposed to more common molecules like CO, NO, and OH). Observations of multiple rotational transitions of C_{2}H can result in estimates of the local density and temperature. Observations of the deuterated molecule, C_{2}D, can test and extend fractionation theories (which explain the enhanced abundance of deuterated molecules in the interstellar medium). One of the important indirect uses for observations of the ethynyl radical is the determination of acetylene abundances. Acetylene (C_{2}H_{2}) does not have a dipole moment, and therefore pure rotational transitions (typically occurring in the microwave region of the spectrum) are too weak to be observable. Since acetylene provides a dominant formation pathway to ethynyl, observations of the product can yield estimates of the unobservable acetylene. Observations of C_{2}H in star-forming regions frequently exhibit shell structures, which implies that it is quickly converted to more complex molecules in the densest regions of a molecular cloud. C_{2}H can therefore be used to study the initial conditions at the onset of massive star formation in dense cores. Finally, high-spectral-resolution observations of Zeeman splitting in C_{2}H can give information about the magnetic fields in dense clouds, which can augment similar observations that are more commonly done in the simpler cyano radical (CN).

== Formation and destruction ==
The formation and destruction mechanisms of the ethynyl radical vary widely with its environment. The mechanisms listed below represent the current (as of 2008) understanding, but other formation and destruction pathways may be possible, or even dominant, in certain situations.

=== Formation ===
In the laboratory, C_{2}H can be made via photolysis of acetylene (C_{2}H_{2}) or C_{2}HCF_{3}, or in a glow discharge of a mixture of acetylene and helium. In the envelopes of carbon-rich evolved stars, acetylene is created in the thermal equilibrium in the stellar photosphere. Ethynyl is created as a photodissociation product of the acetylene that is ejected (via strong stellar winds) into the outer envelope of these stars. In the cold, dense cores of molecular clouds (prior to star formation) where n > 10^{4} cm^{−3} and T < 20 K, ethynyl is dominantly formed via an electron recombination with the vinyl radical (C_{2}H^{+}_{3}). The neutral-neutral reaction of propynylidyne (C_{3}H) and atomic oxygen also produces ethynyl (and carbon monoxide, CO), though this is typically not a dominant formation mechanism. The dominant creation reactions are listed below.

- C_{2}H^{+}_{3} + e^{−} → C_{2}H + H + H
- C_{2}H^{+}_{3} + e^{−} → C_{2}H + H_{2}
- CH_{3}CCH^{+} + e^{−} → C_{2}H + CH_{3}
- C_{3}H + O → C_{2}H + CO

=== Destruction ===
The destruction of ethynyl is dominantly through neutral-neutral reactions with O_{2} (producing carbon monoxide and formyl, HCO), or with atomic nitrogen (producing atomic hydrogen and C_{2}N). Ion-neutral reactions can also play a role in the destruction of ethynyl, through reactions with HCO^{+} and H^{+}_{3}. The dominant destruction reactions are listed below.

- C_{2}H + O_{2} → HCO + CO
- C_{2}H + N → C_{2}N + H
- C_{2}H + HCO^{+} → C_{2}H^{+}_{2} + CO
- C_{2}H + H^{+}_{3} → C_{2}H^{+}_{2} + H_{2}

== Method of observation ==
The ethynyl radical is observed in the microwave portion of the spectrum via pure rotational transitions. In its ground electronic and vibrational state, the nuclei are collinear, and the molecule has a permanent dipole moment estimated to be μ = 0.8 D = 2.7×10^{−30} C·m. The ground vibrational and electronic (vibronic) state exhibits a simple rigid rotor-type rotational spectrum. However, each rotational state exhibits fine and hyperfine structure, due to the spin-orbit and electron-nucleus interactions, respectively. The ground rotational state is split into two hyperfine states, and the higher rotational states are each split into four hyperfine states. Selection rules prohibit all but six transitions between the ground and the first excited rotational state. Four of the six components were observed by Tucker et al. in 1974, the initial astronomical detection of ethynyl, and 4 years later, all six components were observed, which provided the final piece of evidence confirming the initial identification of the previously unassigned lines. Transitions between two adjacent higher-lying rotational states have 11 hyperfine components. The molecular constants of the ground vibronic state are tabulated below.

== Isotopologues ==
Three isotopologues of the ^{12}C^{12}CH molecule have been observed in the interstellar medium. The change in molecular mass is associated with a shift in the energy levels and therefore the transition frequencies associated with the molecule. The molecular constants of the ground vibronic state, and the approximate transition frequency for the lowest 5 rotational transitions are given for each of the isotopologues in the table below.

Rotational transitions for ethenyl isotopologues
Isotopologue	Year discovered	Molecular constants (MHz)		Transition frequencies (MHz)	
^{12}C^{12}CH	1974	B D γ b c	43674.534; 0.1071 −62.606; 40.426; 12.254	N = 1→0; N = 2→1; N = 3→2; N = 4→3; N = 5→4	87348.64; 174694.71; 262035.64; 349368.85; 436691.79
^{12}C^{12}CD	1985	B D γ b c	36068.035; 0.0687 −55.84; 6.35; 1.59	N = 1→0; N = 2→1; N = 3→2; N = 4→3; N = 5→4	72135.80; 144269.94; 216400.79; 288526.69; 360646.00
^{13}C^{12}CH	1994	B D γ	42077.459; 0.09805 −59.84	N = 1→0; N = 2→1; N = 3→2; N = 4→3; N = 5→4	84154.53; 168306.70; 252454.16; 336594.57; 420725.57
^{12}C^{13}CH	1994	B D γ	42631.3831; 0.10131 −61.207	N = 1→0; N = 2→1; N = 3→2; N = 4→3; N = 5→4	85262.36; 170522.29; 255777.36; 341025.13; 426263.18

== See also ==
- List of molecules in interstellar space
