= Carbon monophosphide =

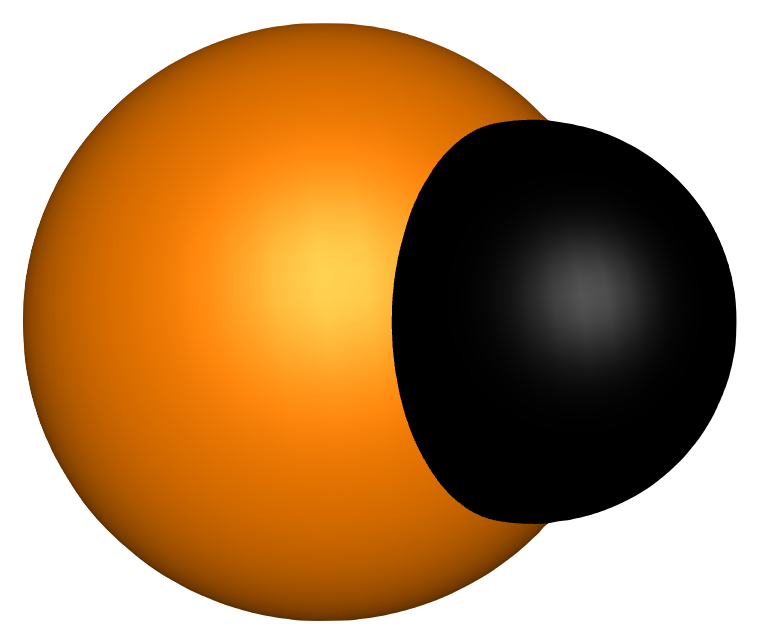

Names
- Preferred IUPAC name Phosphanylidynemethyl
- Other names Carbon phosphide Carbon monophosphide Phosphidocarbonate(II); Cyaphogenyl radical

Identifiers
3D model (JSmol)	Interactive image
PubChem CID	102183332
- InChI: InChI=1S/CP/c1-2 Key: GDPLAAHPHNAIGW-UHFFFAOYSA-N
- SMILES: [C]#P

Properties
Chemical formula	^{·}CP
Molar mass	42.985 g·mol^{−1}

Related compounds
Related compounds	CN SiP CCP radical, HCP
- Except where otherwise noted, data are given for materials in their standard state (at 25 °C [77 °F], 100 kPa). Infobox references

Carbon monophosphide is a diatomic chemical with formula CP. It is a heavier analog of the cyanide radical (CN). CP and CN are both open-shell species with doublet Π ground electronic states while the ground states of CS and CO are closed-shell. The related anion, CP^{−}, is called cyaphide and isoelectronic with CS.

== Detection in interstellar medium ==
Carbon monophosphide was detected in the circumstellar envelope of the star IRC +10216 in 1990, observed with the IRAM 30m radiotelescope.
