= Interstellar formaldehyde =

Chemical detected in space

Interstellar formaldehyde (a topic relevant to astrochemistry) was first discovered in 1969 by L. Snyder et al. using the National Radio Astronomy Observatory. Formaldehyde (H_{2}CO) was detected by means of the 1_{11} - 1_{10} ground state rotational transition at 4830 MHz. On 11 August 2014, astronomers released studies, using the Atacama Large Millimeter/Submillimeter Array (ALMA) for the first time, that detailed the distribution of HCN, HNC, H_{2}CO, and dust inside the comae of comets C/2012 F6 (Lemmon) and C/2012 S1 (ISON).

== Initial discovery ==
Formaldehyde was first discovered in interstellar space in 1969 by L. Snyder et al. using the National Radio Astronomy Observatory. H_{2}CO was detected by means of the 1_{11} - 1_{10} ground state rotational transition at 4830 MHz.

Formaldehyde was the first polyatomic organic molecule detected in the interstellar medium and since its initial detection has been observed in many regions of the galaxy. The isotopic ratio of [^{12}C]/[^{13}C] was determined to be about or less than 50% in the galactic disk. Formaldehyde has been used to map out kinematic features of dark clouds located near Gould's Belt of local bright stars. In 2007, the first H_{2}CO 6 cm maser flare was detected. It was a short duration outburst in IRAS 18566 + 0408 that produced a line profile consistent with the superposition of two Gaussian components, which leads to the belief that an event outside the maser gas triggered simultaneous flares at two different locations. Although this was the first maser flare detected, H_{2}CO masers have been observed since 1974 by Downes and Wilson in NGC 7538. Unlike OH, H_{2}O, and CH_{3}OH, only five galactic star forming regions have associated formaldehyde maser emission, which has only been observed through the 1_{10} → 1_{11} transition.

According to Araya et al., H_{2}CO are different from other masers in that they are weaker than most other masers (such as OH, CH_{3}OH, and H_{2}O) and have only been detected near very young massive stellar objects. Unlike OH, H_{2}O, and CH_{3}OH, only five galactic star forming regions have associated formaldehyde maser emission, which has only been observed through the 1_{10} → 1_{11} transition. Because of the widespread interest in interstellar formaldehyde it has recently been extensively studied, yielding new extragalactic sources, including NGC 253, NGC 520, NGC 660, NGC 891, NGC 2903, NGC 3079, NGC 3628, NGC 6240, NGC 6946, IC 342, IC 860, Arp 55, Arp 220, M82, M83, IRAS 10173+0828, IRAS 15107+0724, and IRAS 17468+1320.

== Interstellar reactions ==
The gas-phase reaction that produces formaldehyde possesses modest barriers and is too inefficient to produce the abundance of formaldehyde that has been observed. One proposed mechanism for the formation is the hydrogenation of CO ice, shown below.

H + CO → HCO + H → H_{2}CO (rate constant=9.2*10^{−3} s^{−1})

This is the basic production mechanism leading to H_{2}CO; there are several side reactions that take place with each step of the reaction that are based on the nature of the ice on the grain according to David Woon. The rate constant presented is for the hydrogenation of CO. The rate constant for the hydrogenation of HCO was not provided as it was much larger than that of the hydrogenation of CO, likely because HCO is a radical. Awad et al. mention that this is a surface level reaction only and only the monolayer is considered in calculations; this includes the surface within cracks in the ice.

Formaldehyde is relatively inactive in gas phase chemistry in the interstellar medium. Its action is predominantly focused in grain-surface chemistry on dust grains in interstellar clouds. Reactions involving formaldehyde have been observed to produce molecules containing C-H, C-O, O-H, and C-N bonds. While these products are not necessarily well known, Schutte et al. believe these to be typical products of formaldehyde reactions at higher temperatures, polyoxymethylene, methanolamine, methanediol, and methoxyethanol for example (see Table 2). Formaldehyde is believed to be the primary precursor for most of the complex organic material in the interstellar medium, including amino acids. Formaldehyde most often reacts with NH_{3}, H_{2}O, CH_{3}OH, CO, and itself, H_{2}CO. The three dominating reactions are shown below.

H_{2}CO + NH_{3} → amine (when [NH_{3}]:[H_{2}CO] > .2)

H_{2}CO + H_{2}O → diols (always dominate as [H_{2}O] > [H_{2}CO])

H_{2}CO + H_{2}CO → [-CH_{2}-O-]_{n} (catalyzed by NH_{3} when [NH_{3}]:[H_{2}CO] > .005)

There is no kinetic data available for these reactions as the entire reaction is not verified nor well understood. These reactions are believed to take place during warm-up of the ice on grains which releases the molecules to react. These reactions begin at temperatures as low as 40K - 80K but may take place at even lower temperatures.

Note that many other reactions are listed on the UMIST RATE06 database.

== Importance of observation ==
Formaldehyde appears to be a useful probe for astrochemists due to its low reactivity in the gas phase and to the fact that the 1_{10} - 1_{11} and 2_{11} - 2_{12} K-doublet transitions are rather clear. Formaldehyde has been used in many capacities and to investigate many systems including,

- Determination of the [^{12}C]/[^{13}C] ratio to be less than 50 in the galactic disc.
- Mapping of the kinematic features of dark clouds located near Gould's Belt of local bright stars. The radial velocities determined for these clouds lead Sandqvist et al. to believe that the clouds participate in the expansion of the local system of H gas and bright stars.
- Determination of the temperature of molecular formation from the ratio of ortho-/para- H_{2}CO. H_{2}CO is a good candidate for this process because of the near zero probability of nuclear spin conversion in gas phase protostar environments.
- Determination of the spatial density of H_{2} and dense gas mass in several galaxies with varying luminosity (see Subsequent Discoveries for list of galaxies). The spatial densities calculated fell in the range of 10^{4.7} to 10^{5.7} cm^{−3} and dense gas masses calculated fell in the range of 0.6 × 10^{8} to 0.77 × 10^{9} solar masses. Mangum et al. noticed that the galaxies with lower infrared luminosity had lower dense gas masses and that this seemed to be a real trend despite the small data set.

== Rotational spectrum ==
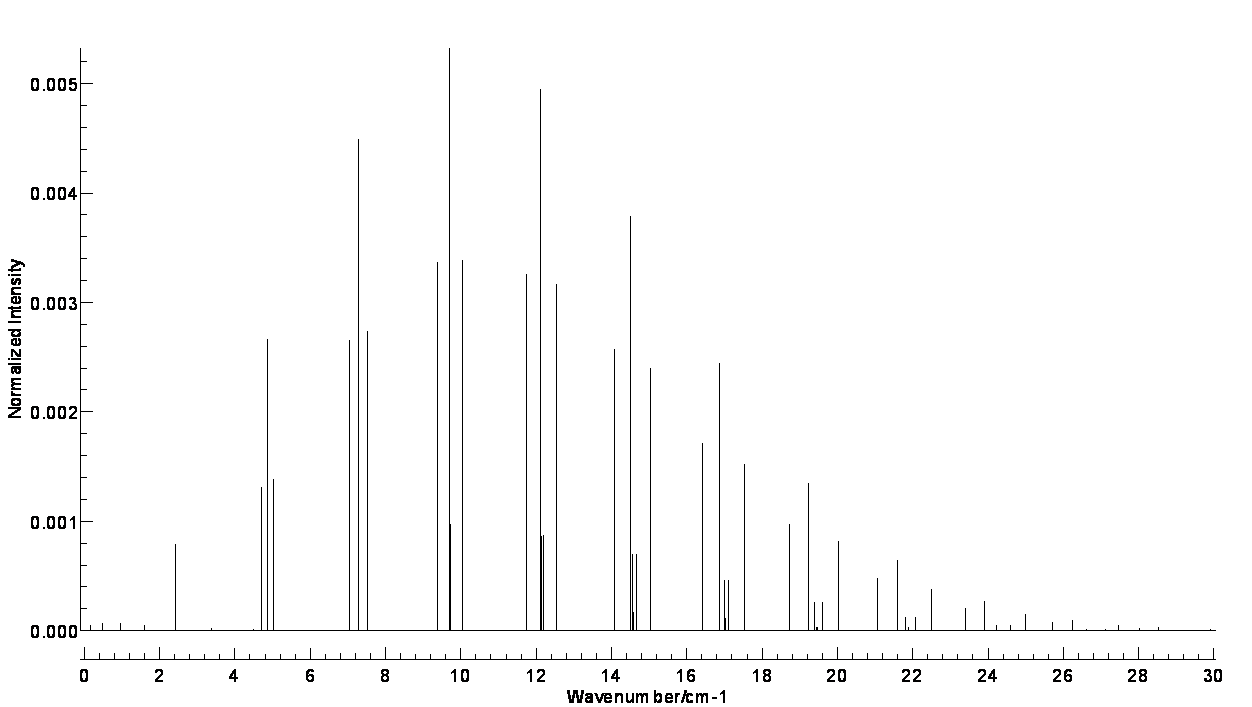
A rotational spectrum of H_{2}CO at the ground state vibrational level at 30 K.

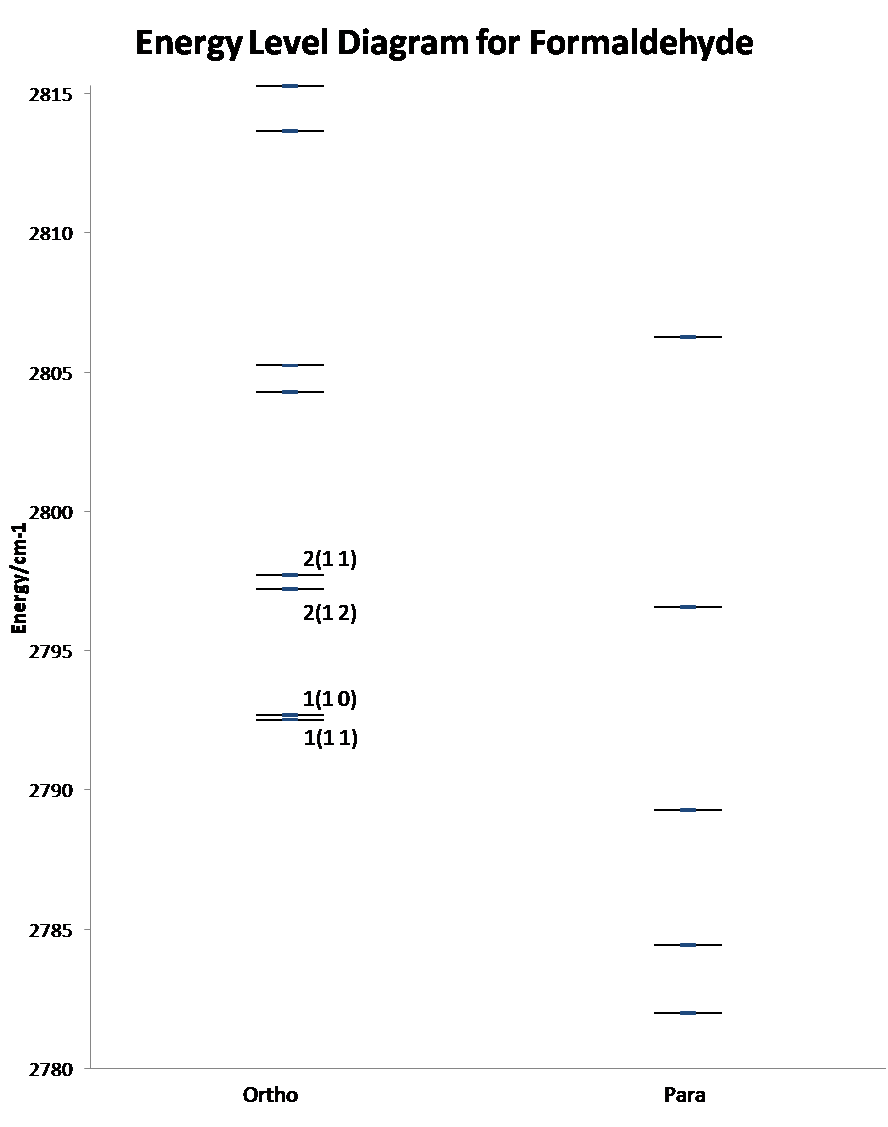
The rotational energy level diagram of H_{2}CO at 30 K shown with ortho/para splitting.

Above is the rotational spectrum at the ground state vibrational level of H_{2}CO at 30 K. This spectrum was simulated using Pgopher and S-Reduction Rotational constants from Muller et al. The observed transitions are the 6.2 cm 1_{11} - 1_{10} and 2.1 cm 2_{12} - 2_{11} K-doublet transitions. At right is the rotational energy level diagram. The ortho/para splitting is determined by the parity of K_{a}, ortho if K_{a} is odd and para if K_{a} is even.

== See also ==
- List of interstellar and circumstellar molecules

== Sources ==
- Woon, D. E. 2002, Astrophysical Journal, 569, 541
- Tudorie, M. et al. 2006, Astronomy and Astrophysics, 453, 755
- Muller, H. S. P. et al. 2000, Journal of Molecular Spectroscopy, 200, 143
- S. Brunken et al. 2003, Physical Chemistry Chemical Physics, 5, 1515
- W. A. Schutte et al. 1993, Science, 259, 1143
- W. A. Schutte et al. 1993, Icarus, 104, 118
