= CW Leonis =

Carbon star in the constellation Leo

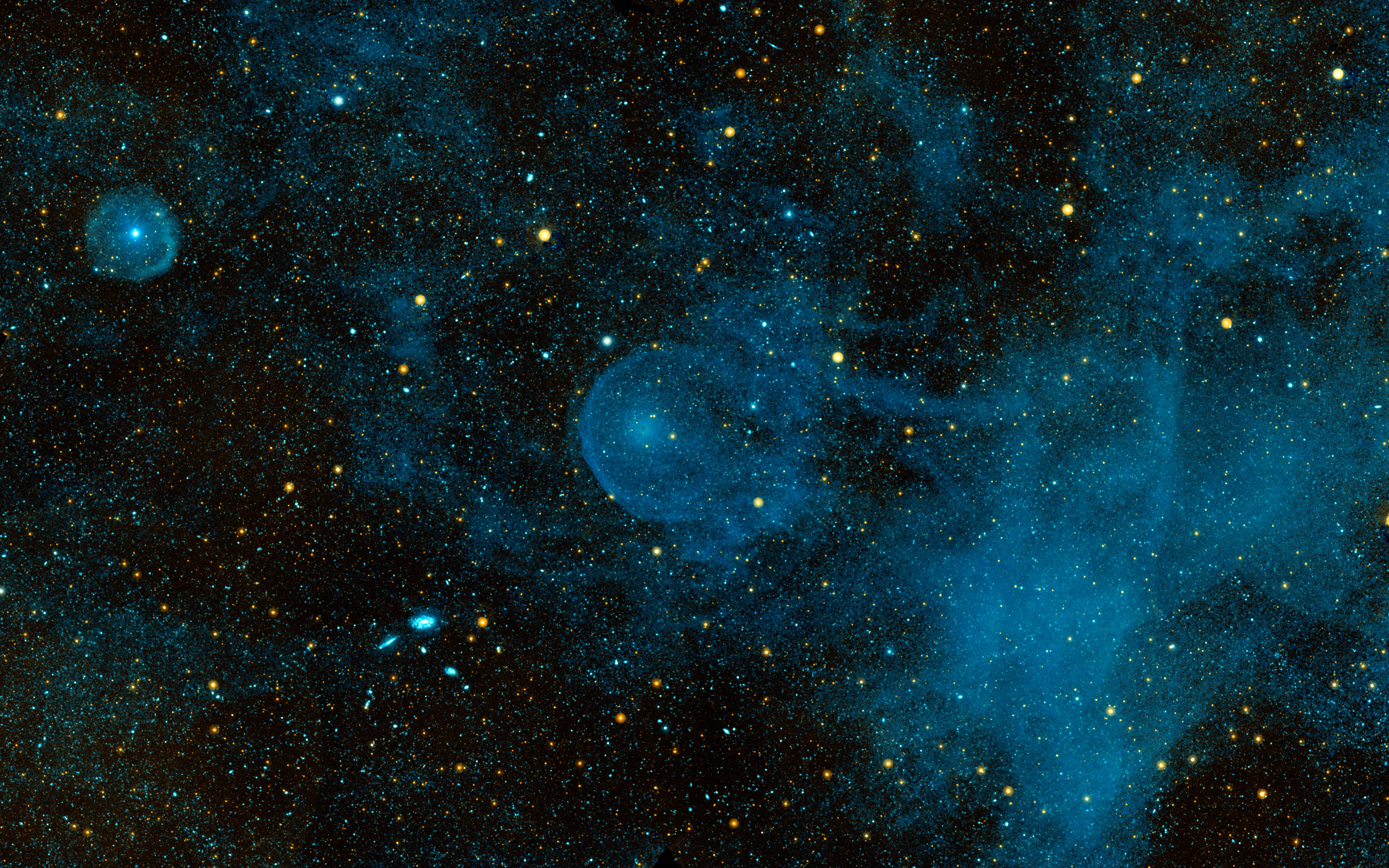
- CW Leonis in ultraviolet showing the bowshock

Observation data Epoch J2000 Equinox ICRS
- Constellation: Leo
- Right ascension: 09^{h} 47^{m} 57.406^{s}
- Declination: +13° 16′ 43.56″
- Apparent magnitude (V): 14.5 (var.)

Characteristics
- Evolutionary stage: AGB
- Spectral type: C9,5e
- Apparent magnitude (R): 10.96
- Apparent magnitude (J): 7.34
- Apparent magnitude (H): 4.04
- Apparent magnitude (K): 1.19
- Variable type: Mira

Astrometry
Proper motion (μ)	RA: 35±1 mas/yr Dec.: 12±1 mas/yr
Parallax (π)	10.56±2.02 mas
Distance	approx. 310 ly (approx. 90 pc)

Details
Mass	0.7 - 0.9 M_{☉}
Radius	560 R_{☉}
Luminosity	8,500 (average), 11,850 (maximum) L_{☉}
Temperature	2,300 (1,915 - 2,105) K

Other designations
- Peanut Nebula, CW Leo, IRAS 09452+1330, IRC +10216, 2MASS J09475740+1316435, PK 221+45 1, Zel 0945+135, RAFGL 1381, SCM 50

Database references
SIMBAD	data

CW Leonis or IRC +10216 is a variable carbon star that is embedded in a thick dust envelope. It was first discovered in 1969 by a group of astronomers led by Eric Becklin, based upon infrared observations made with the 62-inch Caltech Infrared Telescope at Mount Wilson Observatory. Its energy is emitted mostly at infrared wavelengths. At a wavelength of 5 μm (in the mid-infrared), it is the brightest object outside the Solar System, but in visible light it is much too faint to be seen with the naked eye.

== Properties ==
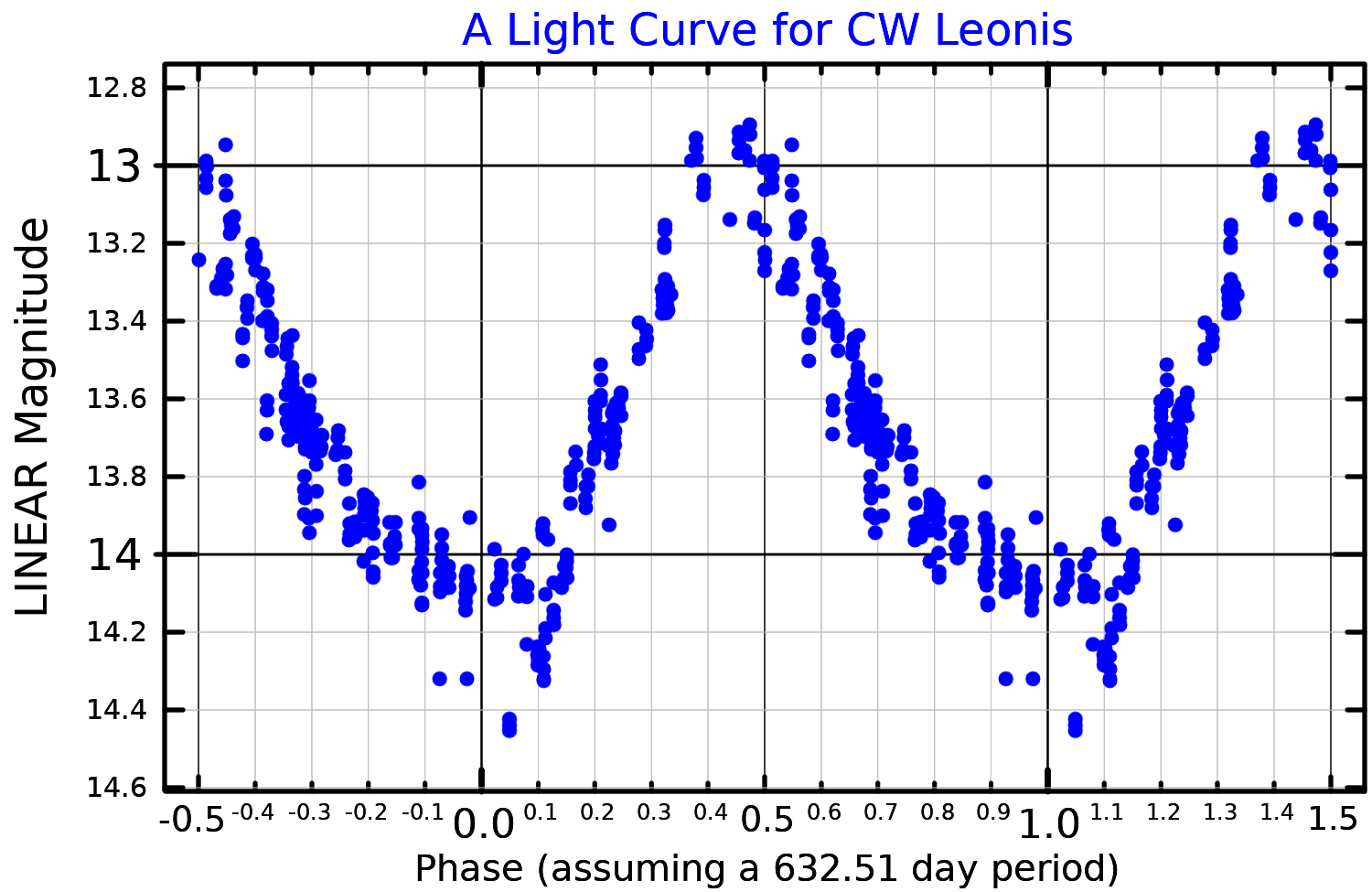
A LINEAR (white-light) light curve for CW Leonis, adapted from Palaversa et al. (2013)

CW Leonis is believed to be in a late stage of its life, blowing off its own sooty atmosphere to form a white dwarf. Based upon isotope ratios of magnesium, the initial mass of this star has been constrained to lie between 3–5 solar masses. The mass of the star's core, and the final mass of the star once it becomes a white dwarf, is about 0.7–0.9 solar masses. Its bolometric luminosity varies over the course of a 649-day pulsation cycle, ranging from a minimum of about 6,250 times the Sun's luminosity up to a peak of around 15,800 times. The overall output of the star is best represented by a luminosity of 11,300 L_{☉}. The brightness of the star varies by about two magnitudes over its pulsation period, and may have been increasing over a period of years. One study finds an increase in the mean brightness of about a magnitude between 2004 and 2014. Many studies of this star are done at infrared wavelengths because of its very red colour; published visual magnitudes are uncommon and often dramatically different. The Guide Star Catalog from 2006 gives an apparent visual magnitude of 19.23. The ASAS-SN variable star catalog based on observations from 2014 to 2018 reports a mean magnitude of 17.56 and an amplitude of 0.68 magnitudes. An even later study gives a mean magnitude of 14.5 and an amplitude of 2.0 magnitudes.

The carbon-rich gaseous envelope surrounding this star is at least 69,000 years old and the star is losing about (1–4) × 10^{−5} solar masses per year. The extended envelope contains at least 1.4 solar masses of material. Speckle observations from 1999 show a complex structure to this dust envelope, including partial arcs and unfinished shells. This clumpiness may be caused by a magnetic cycle in the star that is comparable to the solar cycle in the Sun and results in periodic increases in mass loss.

Various chemical elements and about 50 molecules have been detected in the outflows from CW Leonis, among others nitrogen, oxygen and water, silicon, and iron. One theory was that the star was once surrounded by comets that melted once the star started expanding, but water is now thought to form naturally in the atmospheres of all carbon stars.

== Distance ==
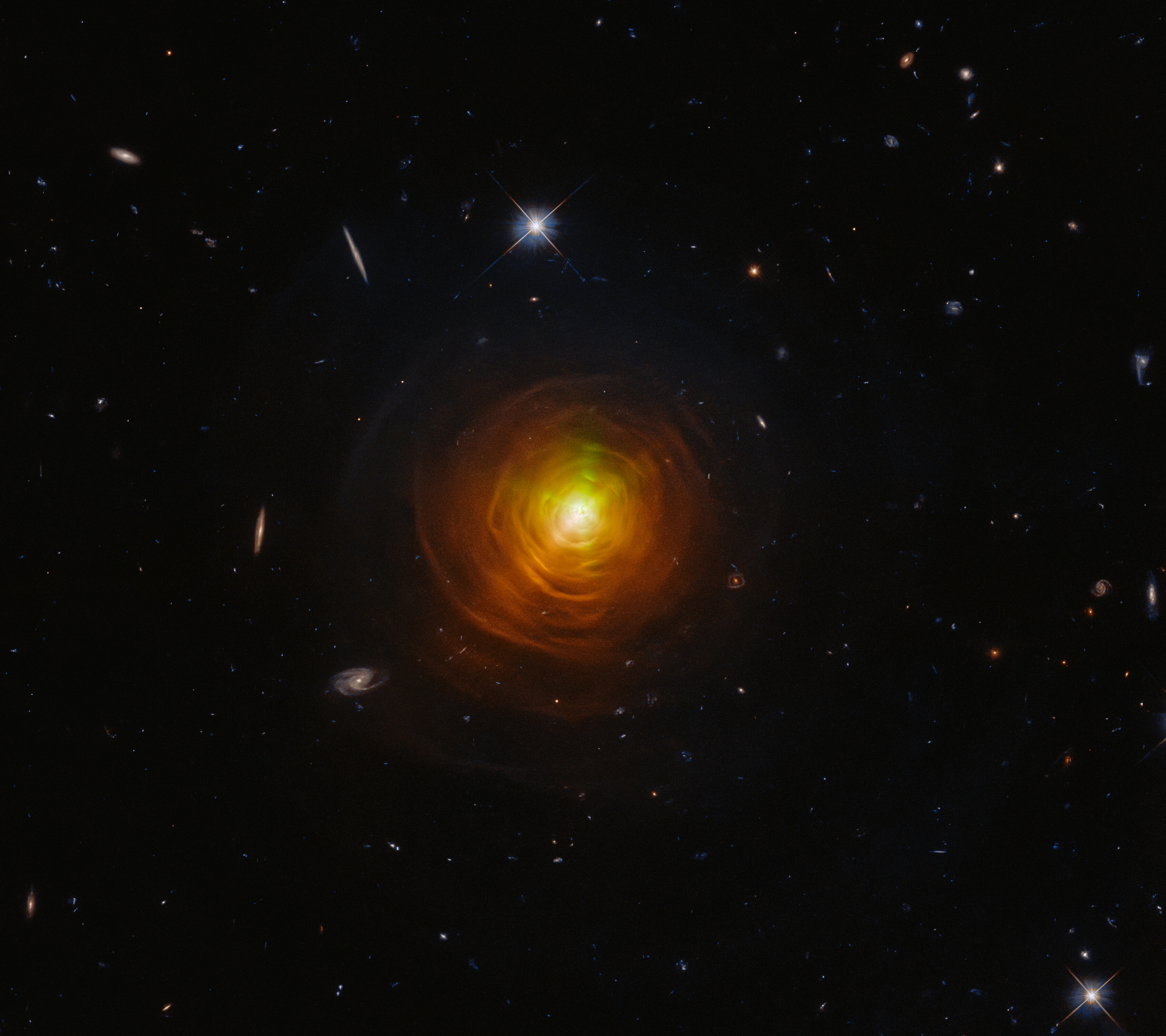
CW Leonis glows from deep within a thick shroud of dust in this image from the NASA/ESA Hubble Space Telescope.

If the distance to this star is assumed to be at the lower end of the estimate range, 120 pc, then the astrosphere surrounding the star spans a radius of about 84,000 AU. The star and its surrounding envelope are advancing at a velocity of more than 91 km/s through the surrounding interstellar medium. It is moving with a space velocity of [U, V, W] = [21.6 ± 3.9, 12.6 ± 3.5, 1.8 ± 3.3] km s^{−1}.

== Companion ==
Several papers have suggested that CW Leonis has a close binary companion. ALMA and astrometric measurements may show orbital motion. The astrometric measurements, combined with a model including the companion, provide a parallax measurement showing that CW Leonis is the closest carbon star to the Earth.

== See also ==
- List of largest known stars
