= Aluminium monohydroxide =

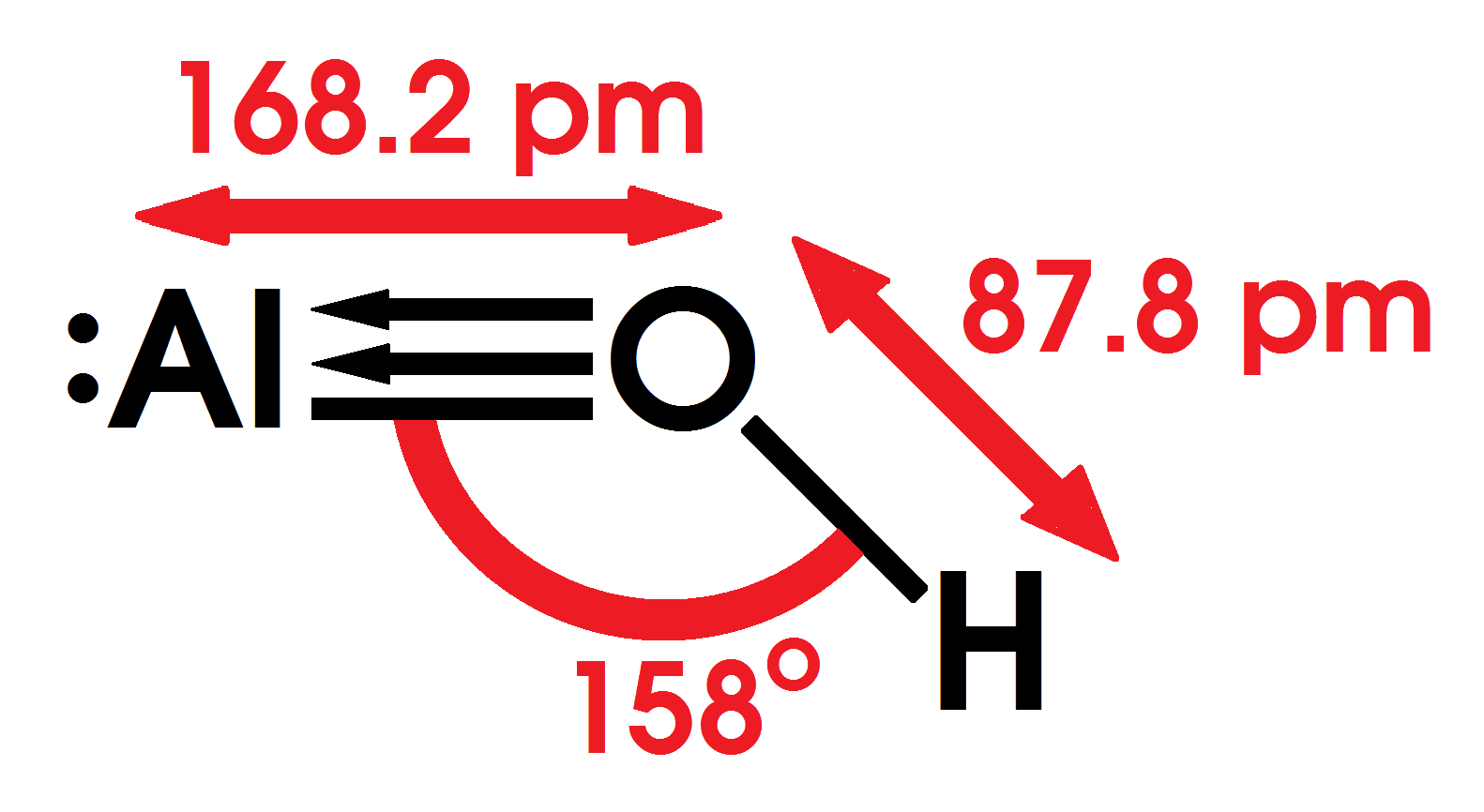

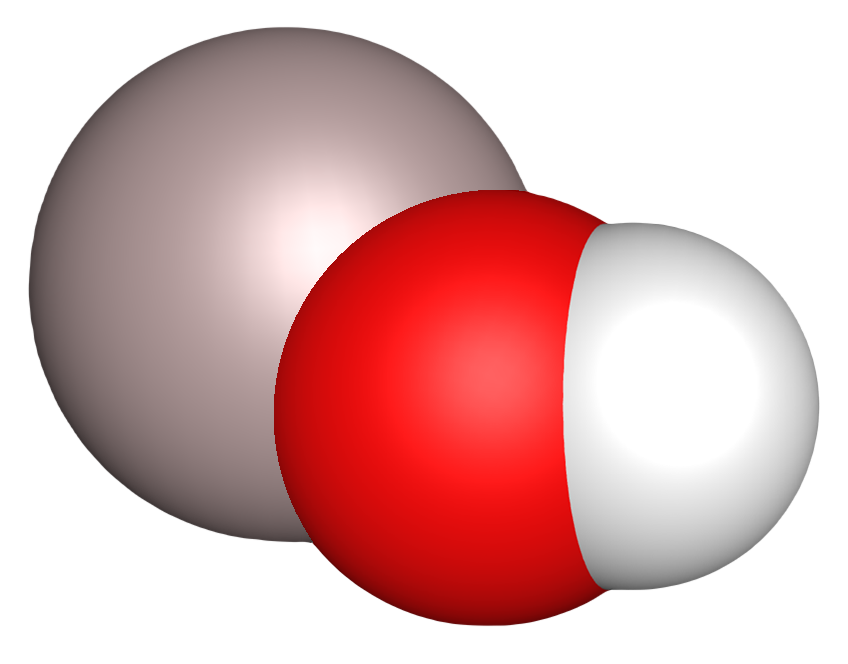

Names
- IUPAC name Hydroxyaluminium(I)

Identifiers
CAS Number	20768-67-6
3D model (JSmol)	Interactive image
- InChI: InChI=1S/Al.H2O/h;1H2/q+1;/p-1 Key: MPJGFDUNKYERDK-UHFFFAOYSA-M
- SMILES: [Al]O

Properties
Chemical formula	AlOH
Molar mass	43.989 g·mol^{−1}

Related compounds
Other anions	AlSH
Other cations	GaOH, InOH, TlOH
Related compounds	Al(OH)_{2}, Al(OH)_{3}
- Except where otherwise noted, data are given for materials in their standard state (at 25 °C [77 °F], 100 kPa). Infobox references

Hydroxyaluminium(I), also known as Aluminium(I) hydroxide, is an inorganic chemical with molecular formula AlOH. It consists of aluminium in the +1 oxidation state paired with a single hydroxide. It has been detected as a molecular substance in the envelope of an oxygen-rich red supergiant star, a place where substances containing metals or hydroxides are thought to be rare.

== Production ==
In the laboratory AlOH can be made by heating aluminium, so that it vapourises into low pressure hydrogen peroxide vapour. Another method is to condense a mixture of aluminium vapour, hydrogen and oxygen with argon into a solid at 10K. Along with AlOH, there are also Al(OH)_{2}, Al(OH)_{3}, HAl(OH)_{2}, cyc-AlO_{2} and AlOAl molecules formed.

== Properties ==
The bond lengths are, Al-O 1.682 Å, and for O-H 0.878 Å. The rotational constants are B_{0}=15,740.2476 MHz and D_{0}=0.02481 MHz.
