= Diacetylene =

Organic compound (HCCCCH)

- Structural formula

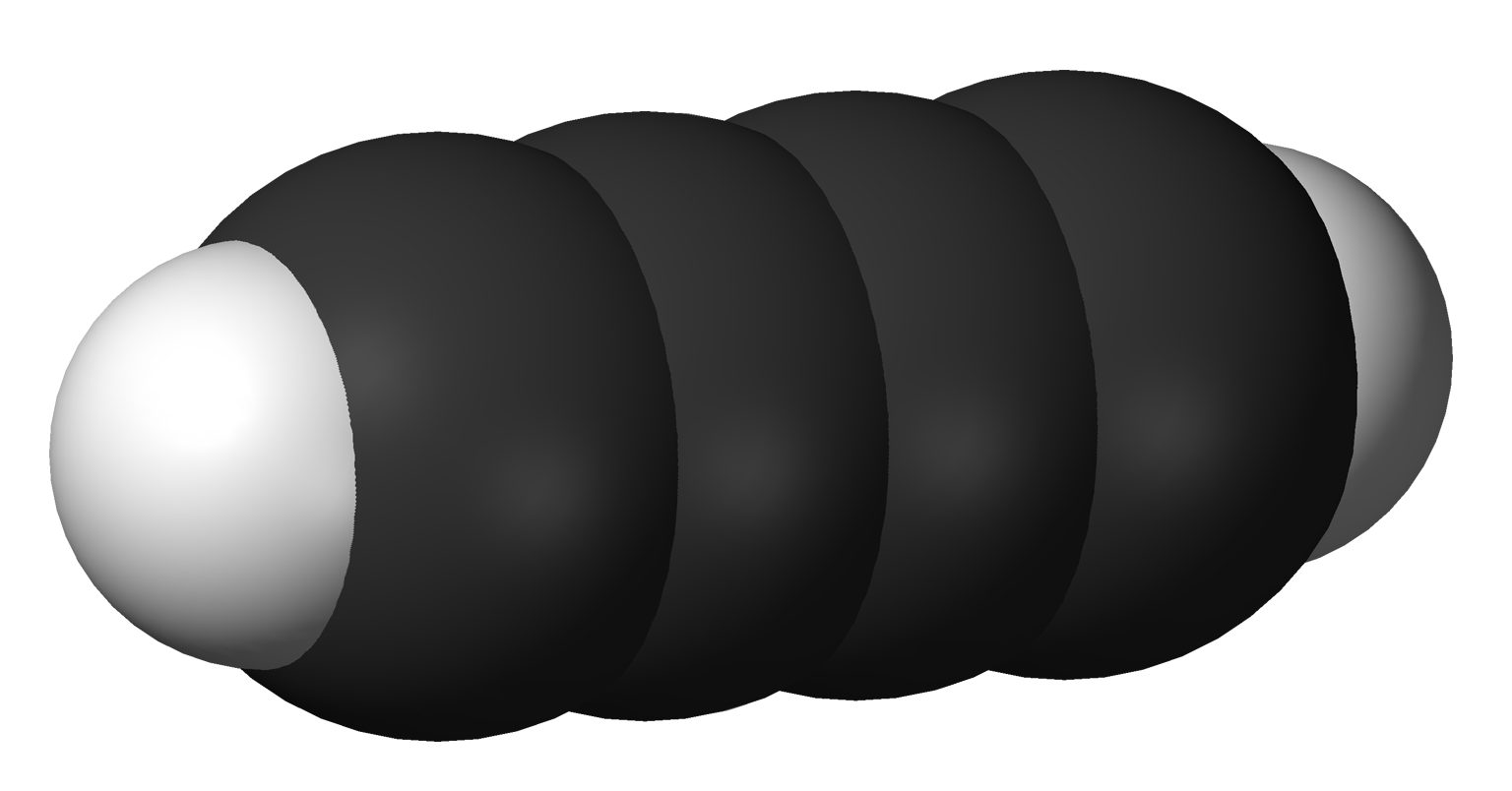
- Space-filling model

Names
- Preferred IUPAC name Buta-1,3-diyne
- Other names 1,3-Butadiyne; Biacetylene; Butadiyne

Identifiers
CAS Number	460-12-8
3D model (JSmol)	Interactive image
Beilstein Reference	1236317
ChEBI	CHEBI:37820
ChemSpider	9603
ECHA InfoCard	100.006.641
EC Number	207-303-9
PubChem CID	9997
UNII	6389J044O5
CompTox Dashboard (EPA)	DTXSID8060036
- InChI: InChI=1S/C4H2/c1-3-4-2/h1-2H Key: LLCSWKVOHICRDD-UHFFFAOYSA-N; InChI=1/C4H2/c1-3-4-2/h1-2H Key: LLCSWKVOHICRDD-UHFFFAOYAU
- SMILES: C#CC#C

Properties
Chemical formula	C_{4}H_{2}
Molar mass	50.060 g·mol^{−1}
Appearance	Colorless gas
Boiling point	10 °C (50 °F; 283 K)

Hazards
- Occupational safety and health (OHS/OSH)
Main hazards	Highly flammable; Peroxide forming
- GHS labelling
Pictograms	(GHS01: Explosive) (GHS02: Flammable)
Signal word	Danger
Safety data sheet (SDS)	External MSDS
- Except where otherwise noted, data are given for materials in their standard state (at 25 °C [77 °F], 100 kPa). verify (what is ?) Infobox references

Diacetylene (also known as butadiyne) is the organic compound with the formula C_{4}H_{2} or H−C≡C−C≡C−H. It is the simplest compound containing two triple bonds. It is first in the series of polyynes, which are of theoretical but not of practical interest.

== Occurrence ==
Diacetylene has been identified in the atmosphere of Titan and in the protoplanetary nebula CRL 618 by its characteristic vibrational spectrum. It is proposed to arise by a reaction between acetylene and the ethynyl radical (C_{2}H), which is produced when acetylene undergoes photolysis. This radical can in turn attack the triple bond in acetylene and react efficiently even at low temperatures. Diacetylene has also been detected on the Moon.

== Preparation ==
This compound may be made by the dehydrohalogenation of 1,4-dichloro-2-butyne by potassium hydroxide (in alcoholic medium) at ~70 °C:

Cl−CH_{2}−C≡C−CH_{2}−Cl + 2 KOH → H−C≡C−C≡C−H + 2 KCl + 2 H_{2}O

The bis(trimethylsilyl)-protected derivative may be prepared by the Hay coupling of (trimethylsilyl)acetylene:

2 (CH_{3})_{3}Si−C≡C−H → (CH_{3})_{3}Si−C≡C−C≡C−Si(CH_{3}) + H_{2}

== See also ==
- Acetylene
- Diiodobutadiyne
- Butenyne
- Hydrocarbon
