= Propynylidyne =

Names
- IUPAC name 1,2-Propadien-1-yl-3-ylidene
- Other names 2-Propyn-1-ylidyne; 2-Propynylidyne

Identifiers
CAS Number	53590-28-6
3D model (JSmol)	Interactive image
PubChem CID	101232590
- InChI: InChI=1S/C3H/c1-3-2/h1H Key: WWDRUPNDOSDMRD-UHFFFAOYSA-N
- SMILES: [C]C#C[H]

Properties
Chemical formula	C_{3}H
Molar mass	37.041 g·mol^{−1}
- Except where otherwise noted, data are given for materials in their standard state (at 25 °C [77 °F], 100 kPa). verify (what is ?) Infobox references

Propynylidyne is a chemical compound that has been identified in interstellar space.

== Structure ==
=== Linear (l-C_{3}H) ===
μ_{D}=3.551 Debye

^{2}Π electronic ground state

==== Simulated spectrum ====
A rotational spectrum of the ^{2}Π electronic ground state of l-C_{3}H can be made using the PGopher software (a Program for Simulating Rotational Structure, C. M. Western, University of Bristol, http://pgopher.chm.bris.ac.uk) and molecular constants extracted from the literature. These constants include μ=3.551 Debye and others provided by Yamamoto et al. 1990, given in units of MHz: B=11189.052, D=0.0051365, A_{SO}=432834.31, γ=-48.57, p=-7.0842, and q=-13.057. A selection rule of ΔJ=0,1 was applied, with S=0.5. The resulting simulation for the rotational spectrum of C_{3}H at a temperature of 30 K agree well with observations. The simulated spectrum is shown in the figure at right with the approximate atmospheric transmission overplotted in blue. All of the strongest simulated lines with J < 8.5 are observed by Yamamoto et al.

=== Cyclic (c-C_{3}H) ===
μ_{D}=2.4 Debye electronic ground state

== Chemistry ==
The molecule C_{3}H has been observed in cold, dense molecular clouds. The dominant formation and destruction mechanisms are presented below, for a typical cloud with temperature 10K. The relative contributions of each reaction have been calculated using rates and abundances from the UMIST database for astrochemistry.

=== Dominant formation reactions ===
Reactant 1	Reactant 2	Product 1	Product 2	Rate Constant	Contribution
C_{3}H_{3}^{+}	e^{−}	C_{3}H	H_{2}	1.0E-7 cm^{3}s^{−1}	81.2%
C	C_{2}H_{2}^{+}	C_{3}H	H^{+}	2.18E-10 cm^{3}s^{−1}	18.8%

=== Dominant destruction reactions ===
Reactant 1	Reactant 2	Product 1	Product 2	Rate Constant	Contribution
O	C_{3}H	CO	C_{2}H	1.7E-11 cm^{3}s^{−1}	95.4%
N	C_{3}H	C_{3}N	H	1.7E-11 cm^{3}s^{−1}	3.7%
H_{3}^{+}	C_{3}H	C_{3}H_{2}^{+}	H	2.0E-9 cm^{3}s^{−1}	0.7%
C^{+}	C_{3}H	C_{4}^{+}	H	1.0E-10 cm^{3}s^{−1}	0.2%
H^{+}	C_{3}H	C_{3}^{+}	H_{2}	2.0E-9 cm^{3}s^{−1}	<<1%

=== Contribution to carbon-chain molecule production ===
The C_{3}H molecule provides the dominant pathway to the production of C_{4}H^{+}, and thereby all other C_{n}H (n>3) molecules via the reactions:

C_{3}H + C^{+} → C_{4}^{+} + H
C_{4}^{+} + H_{2} → C_{4}H^{+} + H

These reactions produce the majority of C_{4}H^{+}, which is necessary for the production of higher-order carbon-chain molecules. Compared to the competing reaction,
C_{3}H_{3}^{+} + C → C_{4}H_{2}^{+} + H,
also shown right, the destruction of C_{3}H provides a much faster pathway for hydrocarbon growth.

Other molecules in the C_{3}H family, C_{2}H and C_{3}H_{2}, do not significantly contribute to the production of carbon-chain molecules, rather forming endpoints in this process. The production of C_{2}H and C_{3}H_{2} essentially inhibits larger carbon-chain molecule formation, since neither they nor the products of their destruction are recycled into the hydrocarbon chemistry.

== First astronomical detection ==
The first confirmation of the existence of the interstellar molecule C_{3}H was announced by W.M Irvine et al. at the January 1985 meeting of the American Astronomical Society. The group detected C_{3}H in both the spectrum of the evolved carbon star IRC+10216 and in the molecular cloud TMC-1. These results were formally published in July of the same year by Thaddeus et al. A 1987 paper by W.M. Irvine provides a comparison of detections for 39 molecules observed in cold (T_{k} ≅10K), dark clouds, with particular emphasis paid to tri-carbon species, including C_{3}H.

== Subsequent astronomical detections ==
Later reports of astronomical detections of the C_{3}H radical are given in chronological order below.

In 1987, Yamamoto et al. report measurements of the rotational spectra of the cyclic C_{3}H radical (c-C_{3}H) in the laboratory and in interstellar space towards TMC-1. This publication marks the first terrestrial measurement of C_{3}H. Yamamoto et al. precisely determine molecular constants and identify 49 lines in the c-C_{3}H rotational spectrum. Both fine and hyperfine components are detected toward TMC-1, and the column density for the line of sight toward TMC-1 is estimated to be 6 trillion/cm^{2}, which is comparable to the linear C_{3}H radical (l-C_{3}H).

M.L Marconi and A. Korth et al. reported a likely detection of C_{3}H within the ionopause of Comet Halley in 1989. Using the heavy ion analyzer (PICCA) on board the Giotto spacecraft they determined that C_{3}H was responsible for producing a peak at 37amu detected within ~4500 km of the comet nucleus. Marconi et al. argue that a gas phase progenitor molecule for C_{3}H is unlikely to exist within the ionopause and suggest that desorption from circumnuclear CHON dust grains may have instead produced the observed C_{3}H.

In 1990, Yamamoto et al. detected C_{3}H toward IRC + 10216 using the Nobeyama Radio Observatory's 45-m radio telescope. They determine an upper limit for the column density of the ν_{4} state 3 trillion/cm^{2}. From additional laboratory measurements they determine an extremely low vibrationally excited state for the C_{3}H radical: ν_{4}(^{2}Σ^{μ})=610197(1230) MHz, caused by the Renner-Teller effect in the ν_{4} (CCH bending) state.

J.G. Mangum and A. Wootten report new detections of c-C_{3}H towards 13 of 19 observed Galactic molecular clouds. They measure relative abundance of C_{3}H to C_{3}H_{2}: N(c-C_{3}H)/N(C_{3}H_{2}) = 9.04±2.87 × 10^{−2}. This ratio does not change systematically for warmer sources, which they suggest provides evidence that the two ring molecules have a common precursor in C_{3}H_{3}^{+}.

L.A. Nyman et al. present a molecular line survey of the carbon star IRAS 15194-5115 using the 15m Swedish-ESO Submillimetre Telescope to probe the 3 and 1.3 mm bands. Comparing the molecular abundances with those of IRC + 10216, they find C_{3}H to have similar abundances in both sources.

In 1993, M. Guelin et al. map the emission from the 95 GHz and 98 GHz lines of the C_{3}H radicals in IRC+10216. This reveals a shell-like distribution of the C_{3}H emission and time-dependent chemistry. The close correspondence between the emission peaks of C_{3}H and the species <noautolink>MgNC</noautolink> and C_{4}H suggests a fast common formation mechanism, suggested to be desorption from dust grains.

Turner et al. survey 10 hydrocarbon species, including l-C_{3}H and c-C_{3}H in three translucent clouds and TMC-1 and L183. Abundances are measured or estimated for each. The mean cyclic-to-linear abundance ratio for C_{3}H is found to be 2.7, although a large variation in this ratio is observed from source to source.

In 2004, N. Kaifu et al. completed the first spectral line survey toward TMC-1 in the frequency range 8.8-50.0 GHz with the 45-m radio telescope at Nobeyama Radio Observatory. They detected 414 lines of 38 molecular species including c-C_{3}H and compiled spectral charts and improved molecular constants for several carbon-chain molecules.

Martin et al. made the first spectral line survey towards an extragalactic source, targeting the starburst galaxy NGC253 across the frequency range 129.1-175.2 GHz. Approximately 100 spectral features were identified as transitions from 25 different molecular species, including a tentative first extra-galactic detection of C_{3}H.
