= Rotational transition =

Abrupt change in a quantum particle's angular momentum

In quantum mechanics, a rotational transition is an abrupt change in angular momentum. Like all other properties of a quantum particle, angular momentum is quantized, meaning it can only equal certain discrete values, which correspond to different rotational energy states. When a particle loses angular momentum, it is said to have transitioned to a lower rotational energy state. Likewise, when a particle gains angular momentum, a positive rotational transition is said to have occurred.

Rotational transitions are important in physics due to the unique spectral lines that result. Because there is a net gain or loss of energy during a transition, electromagnetic radiation of a particular frequency must be absorbed or emitted. This forms spectral lines at that frequency which can be detected with a spectrometer, as in rotational spectroscopy or Raman spectroscopy.

== Diatomic molecules ==
Molecules have rotational energy owing to rotational motion of the nuclei about their center of mass. Due to quantization, these energies can take only certain discrete values. Rotational transition thus corresponds to transition of the molecule from one rotational energy level to the other through gain or loss of a photon. Analysis is simple in the case of diatomic molecules.

=== Nuclear wave function ===
Quantum theoretical analysis of a molecule is simplified by use of Born–Oppenheimer approximation. Typically, rotational energies of molecules are smaller than electronic transition energies by a factor of m/M ≈ 10^{−3}–10^{−5}, where m is electronic mass and M is typical nuclear mass. From uncertainty principle, period of motion is of the order of the Planck constant h divided by its energy. Hence nuclear rotational periods are much longer than the electronic periods. So electronic and nuclear motions can be treated separately. In the simple case of a diatomic molecule, the radial part of the Schrödinger Equation for a nuclear wave function F_{s}(R), in an electronic state s, is written as (neglecting spin interactions)
$$\left[- \frac{\hbar^2}{2\mu R^2} \frac{\partial}{\partial R} \left(R^2 \frac{\partial}{\partial R}\right)+ \frac{\langle \Phi_s|N^2|\Phi_s \rangle}{2\mu R^2}+ E_s(R)-E\right]F_s(\mathbf R) = 0$$
where μ is reduced mass of two nuclei, R is vector joining the two nuclei, E_{s}(R) is energy eigenvalue of electronic wave function Φ_{s} representing electronic state s and N is orbital momentum operator for the relative motion of the two nuclei given by
$$N^2 = -\hbar^2 \left[ \frac{1}{\sin\Theta} \frac{\partial}{\partial \Theta}\left(\sin \Theta \frac{\partial}{\partial \Theta}\right)+ \frac{1}{\sin^2\Theta} \frac{\partial^2}{\partial \Phi^2} \right]$$
The total wave function for the molecule is
$$\Psi_s = F_s(\mathbf R)\Phi_s(\mathbf R,\mathbf r_1, \mathbf r_2, \dots, \mathbf r_N)$$
where r_{i} are position vectors from center of mass of molecule to ith electron. As a consequence of the Born-Oppenheimer approximation, the electronic wave functions Φ_{s} is considered to vary very slowly with R. Thus the Schrödinger equation for an electronic wave function is first solved to obtain E_{s}(R) for different values of R. E_{s} then plays role of a potential well in analysis of nuclear wave functions F_{s}(R).

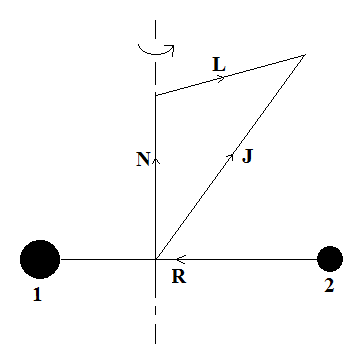
Vector addition triangle for orbital angular momentum of a diatomic molecule with components of orbital angular momentum of nuclei and orbital angular momentum of electrons, neglecting coupling between electron and nuclear orbital motion and spin-dependent coupling.Since angular momentum N of nuclei is perpendicular to internuclear vector R, components of electronic angular momentum L and total angular momentum J along R are equal.

=== Rotational energy levels ===
The first term in the above nuclear wave function equation corresponds to kinetic energy of nuclei due to their radial motion. Term (⟨Φ_{s}| N^{2} |Φ_{s}⟩)/2μR^{2} represents rotational kinetic energy of the two nuclei, about their center of mass, in a given electronic state Φ_{s}. Possible values of the same are different rotational energy levels for the molecule.

Orbital angular momentum for the rotational motion of nuclei can be written as
$$\mathbf N = \mathbf J - \mathbf L$$
where J is the total orbital angular momentum of the whole molecule and L is the orbital angular momentum of the electrons. If internuclear vector R is taken along z-axis, component of N along z-axis – N_{z} – becomes zero as
$$\mathbf N = \mathbf R \times \mathbf P$$
Hence
$$J_z = L_z$$
Since molecular wave function Ψ_{s} is a simultaneous eigenfunction of J^{2} and J_{z},
$$J^2 \Psi_s = J(J+1) \hbar^2 \Psi_s$$
where J is called rotational quantum number and J can be a positive integer or zero.
$$J_z \Psi_s = M_j\hbar \Psi_s$$
where −J ≤ M_{j} ≤ J.

Also since electronic wave function Φ_{s} is an eigenfunction of L_{z},
$$L_z \Phi_s = \pm \Lambda\hbar \Phi_s$$
Hence molecular wave function Ψ_{s} is also an eigenfunction of L_{z} with eigenvalue ±Λħ. Since L_{z} and J_{z} are equal, Ψ_{s} is an eigenfunction of J_{z} with same eigenvalue ±Λħ. As |J| ≥ J_{z}, we have J ≥ Λ. So possible values of rotational quantum number are
$$J = \Lambda, \Lambda +1, \Lambda+2, \dots$$
Thus molecular wave function Ψ_{s} is simultaneous eigenfunction of J^{2}, J_{z} and L_{z}. Since molecule is in eigenstate of L_{z}, expectation value of components perpendicular to the direction of z-axis (internuclear line) is zero. Hence
$$\langle \Psi_s|L_x|\Psi_s\rangle = \langle L_x \rangle = 0$$
and
$$\langle \Psi_s|L_y|\Psi_s\rangle = \langle L_y \rangle = 0$$
Thus
$$\langle \mathbf J . \mathbf L \rangle = \langle J_z L_z \rangle = \langle {L_z}^2 \rangle$$

Putting all these results together,
$$\begin{align}
\langle \Phi_s |N^2|\Phi_s \rangle F_s(\mathbf R) &= \langle \Phi_s | \left(J^2 + L^2 - 2 \mathbf J \cdot \mathbf L\right) |\Phi_s \rangle F_s(\mathbf R) \\
&= \hbar^2 \left[J(J+1)-\Lambda^2\right] F_s(\mathbf R) + \langle \Phi_s | \left({L_x}^2 + {L_y}^2\right) |\Phi_s \rangle F_s(\mathbf R)
\end{align}$$

The Schrödinger equation for the nuclear wave function can now be rewritten as
$$- \frac{\hbar^2}{2\mu R^2}\left[ \frac{\partial}{\partial R} \left(R^2 \frac{\partial}{\partial R}\right)- J(J+1)\right]F_s(\mathbf R)+[{E'}_s(R)-E]F_s(\mathbf R) = 0$$
where
$${E'}_s(R) = E_s(R) - \frac{\Lambda^2 \hbar^2}{2\mu R^2} + \frac{1}{2\mu R^2} \langle \Phi_s |\left({L_x}^2 + {L_y}^2\right)|\Phi_s \rangle$$
E′_{s} now serves as effective potential in radial nuclear wave function equation.

==== Sigma states ====
Molecular states in which the total orbital momentum of electrons is zero are called sigma states. In sigma states Λ = 0. Thus E′_{s}(R) = E_{s}(R). As nuclear motion for a stable molecule is generally confined to a small interval around R_{0} where R_{0} corresponds to internuclear distance for minimum value of potential E_{s}(R_{0}), rotational energies are given by,
$$E_r = \frac{\hbar^2}{2\mu {R_0}^2} J(J+1) = \frac{\hbar^2}{2I_0} J(J+1) = BJ(J+1)$$
with
$$J = \Lambda, \Lambda +1, \Lambda+2, \dots$$
I_{0} is moment of inertia of the molecule corresponding to equilibrium distance R_{0} and B is called rotational constant for a given electronic state Φ_{s}. Since reduced mass μ is much greater than electronic mass, last two terms in the expression of E′_{s}(R) are small compared to E_{s}. Hence even for states other than sigma states, rotational energy is approximately given by above expression.

=== Rotational spectrum ===
When a rotational transition occurs, there is a change in the value of rotational quantum number J. Selection rules for rotational transition are, when Λ = 0, ΔJ = ±1 and when Λ ≠ 0, ΔJ = 0, ±1 as absorbed or emitted photon can make equal and opposite change in total nuclear angular momentum and total electronic angular momentum without changing value of J.

The pure rotational spectrum of a diatomic molecule consists of lines in the far infrared or microwave region. The frequency of these lines is given by
$$\hbar \omega = E_r(J+1)-E_r(J) = 2B(J+1)$$
Thus values of B, I_{0} and R_{0} of a substance can be determined from observed rotational spectrum.

== See also ==
- Vibrational transition
