= Triatomic hydrogen =

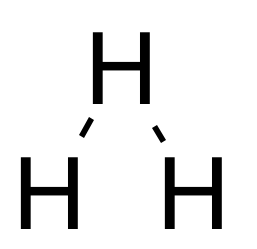

Identifiers
CAS Number	12184-91-7
3D model (JSmol)	Interactive image
CompTox Dashboard (EPA)	DTXSID101319229
- InChI: InChI=1S/H3/c1-2-3-1 Key: FVJJEQURJXHDEY-UHFFFAOYSA-N
- SMILES: [H]1[H][H]1

Properties
Chemical formula	H_{3}
Molar mass	3.024 g·mol^{−1}
- Except where otherwise noted, data are given for materials in their standard state (at 25 °C [77 °F], 100 kPa). Infobox references

Triatomic hydrogen or H_{3} is an unstable triatomic molecule containing only hydrogen. Since this molecule contains only three atoms of hydrogen it is the simplest triatomic molecule and it is relatively simple to numerically solve the quantum mechanics description of the particles. Being unstable, the molecule breaks up in under a millionth of a second. Its fleeting lifetime makes it rare, but it is quite commonly formed and destroyed in the universe thanks to the commonness of the trihydrogen cation. The infrared spectrum of H_{3} due to vibration and rotation is very similar to that of the ion, H^{+}_{3}. In the early universe this ability to emit infrared light allowed the primordial hydrogen and helium gas to cool down so as to form stars.

== Formation ==
The neutral molecule can be formed in a low pressure gas discharge tube.

A neutral beam of H_{3} can be formed from a beam of H^{+}_{3} ions passing through gaseous potassium, which donates an electron to the ion, forming K^{+}. Other gaseous alkali metals, such as caesium, can also be used to donate electrons. H^{+}_{3} ions can be made in a duoplasmatron where an electric discharge passed through low pressure molecular hydrogen. This causes some H_{2} to become H^{+}_{2}. Then H_{2} + H^{+}_{2} → H^{+}_{3} + H. The reaction is exothermic with an energy of 1.7 eV, so the ions produced are hot with much vibrational energy. These can cool down via collisions with cooler gas if the pressure is high enough. This is significant because strongly vibrating ions produce strongly vibrating neutral molecules when neutralised according to the Franck–Condon principle.

== Breakup ==
H_{3} can break up in the following ways:

H_{3} → H^{+}_{3} + e^{−}
H_{3} → H + H_{2}
H_{3} → 3 H
2 H_{3} → 3 H_{2}

== Properties ==
The molecule can only exist in an excited state. The different excited electronic states are represented by symbols for the outer electron nLΓ with n the principal quantum number, L is the electronic angular momentum, and Γ is the electronic symmetry selected from the D_{3h} group. Extra bracketed symbols can be attached showing vibration in the core: {s,d^{l}} with s representing symmetrical stretch, d degenerate mode, and l vibrational angular momentum. Yet another term can be inserted to indicate molecular rotation: (N,G) with N angular momentum apart from electrons as projected on the molecular axis, and G the Hougen's convenient quantum number determined by G=l+λ-K. This is often (1,0), as the rotational states are restricted by the constituent particles all being fermions. Examples of these states are: 2sA_{1}' 3sA_{1}' 2pA_{2}" 3dE' 3DE" 3dA_{1}' 3pE' 3pA_{2}". The 2p^{2}A_{2}" state has a lifetime of 700 ns. If the molecule attempts to lose energy and go to the repulsive ground state, it spontaneously breaks up. The lowest energy metastable state, 2sA_{1}' has an energy -3.777 eV below the H^{+}_{3} and e^{−} state but decays in around 1 ps. The unstable ground state designated 2p^{2}E' spontaneously breaks up into a H_{2} molecule and an H atom. Rotationless states have a longer life time than rotating molecules.

The electronic state for a trihydrogen cation with an electron delocalized around it is a Rydberg state.

The outer electron can be boosted to high Rydberg state, and can ionise if the energy gets to 29562.6 cm^{−1} above the 2pA_{2}" state, in which case H^{+}_{3} forms.

== Shape ==
The shape of the molecule is predicted to be an equilateral triangle. Vibrations can occur in the molecule in two ways, firstly the molecule can expand and contract retaining the equilateral triangle shape (breathing), or one atom can move relative to the others distorting the triangle (bending). The bending vibration has a dipole moment and thus couples to infrared radiation.

== Spectrum ==
Gerhard Herzberg was the first to find spectroscopic lines of neutral H_{3} when he was 75 years old in 1979. Later he announced that this observation was one of his favourite discoveries. The lines came about from a cathode discharge tube. The reason that earlier observers could not see any H_{3} spectral lines, was due to them being swamped by the spectrum of the much more abundant H_{2}. The important advance was to separate out H_{3} so it could be observed alone. Separation uses mass spectrometry separation of the positive ions, so that H_{3} with mass 3 can be separated from H_{2} with mass 2. However there is still some contamination from HD, which also has mass 3. The spectrum of H_{3} is mainly due to transitions to the longer lived state of 2p^{2}A_{2}". The spectrum can be measured via a two step photo-ionization method.

Transitions dropping to the lower 2s^{2}A_{1}' state are affected by its very short lifetime in what is called predissociation. The spectral lines involved are broadened. In the spectrum there are bands due to rotation with P Q and R branches. The R branch is very weak in H_{3} isotopomer but strong with D_{3} (trideuterium).

lower state	upper electronic state	breathing vibration	bending vibration	angular momentum	G=λ+l_{2}-K	wavenumber cm^{−1}	wavelength Å	frequency THz	energy eV
2p^{2}A_{2}"	3s^{2}A_{1}'	0	0			16695	5990	500.5	2.069
2p^{2}A_{2}"	3d^{2}A"	0	0			17297	5781	518.6	2.1446
2p^{2}A_{2}"	3d^{2}A_{1}'	0	0			17742	5636	531.9	2.1997
2p^{2}A_{2}"	3p^{2}E'	1	1			18521	5399	555.2	2.2963
2p^{2}A_{2}"	3p^{2}A_{2}"	0	1			19451	5141.1	583.1	2.4116
2p^{2}A_{2}"	3d^{2}E'	0	1			19542	5117	585.85	2.4229
2p^{2}A_{2}"	3s^{2}A_{1}'	1	0			19907	5023.39	596.8	2.46818
2p^{2}A_{2}"	3p^{2}E'	0	3			19994	5001.58	599.48	2.47898
2p^{2}A_{2}"	3d^{2}E"	1	0			20465	4886.4	613.524	2.5373
2s^{2}A_{1}'	3p^{2}E'					14084	7100	422.2	1.746
2s^{2}A_{1}'	3p^{2}A_{2}"				band	17857	5600	535	2.2
2s^{2}A_{1}'	3p^{2}A_{2}" Q branch			all superimposed	band	17787	5622	533	2.205

The symmetric stretch vibration mode has a wave number of 3213.1 cm^{−1} for the 3s^{2}A_{1}' level and 3168 cm^{−1} for 3d^{2}E" and 3254 cm^{−1} for 2p^{2}A_{2}". The bending vibrational frequencies are also quite similar to those for H^{+}_{3}.

=== Levels ===
electronic state	note	wavenumber cm^{−1}	frequency THz	energy eV	life ns
3d^{2}A_{1}'		18511	554.95	2.2951	12.9
3d^{2}E"		18409	551.89	2.2824	11.9
3d^{2}E'		18037	540.73	2.2363	9.4
3p^{2}A_{2}"		17789	533.30	2.2055	41.3 4.1
3s^{2}A_{1}'		17600	527.638	2.1821	58.1
3p^{2}E'		13961	418.54	1.7309	22.6
2p^{2}A_{2}"	longest life	993	29.76	0.12311	69700
2p^{2}A_{2}"	predissociation	0	0	0	21.8
2p^{2}E'	dissociation	−16674	−499.87	−2.0673	0

== Cation ==
The related H^{+}_{3} ion is the most prevalent molecular ion in interstellar space. It is believed to have played a crucial role in the cooling of early stars in the history of the Universe through its ability readily to absorb and emit photons. One of the most important chemical reactions in interstellar space is H^{+}_{3} + e^{−} → H_{3} and then → H_{2} + H.

== Calculations ==
Since the molecule is relatively simple, researchers have attempted to calculate the properties of the molecule ab-initio from quantum theory. The Hartree–Fock equations have been used.

== Natural occurrence ==
Triatomic hydrogen will be formed during the neutralization of H^{+}_{3}. This ion will be neutralised in the presence of gasses other than He or H_{2}, as it can abstract an electron. Thus H_{3} is formed in the aurora in the ionosphere of Jupiter and Saturn.

== History ==
Stark's 1913 model of triatomic hydrogen

J. J. Thomson observed H^{+}_{3} while experimenting with positive rays. He believed that it was an ionised form of H_{3} from about 1911. He believed that H_{3} was a stable molecule and wrote and lectured about it. He stated that the easiest way to make it was to target potassium hydroxide with cathode rays. In 1913 Johannes Stark proposed that three hydrogen nuclei and electrons could form a stable ring shape. In 1919 Niels Bohr proposed a structure with three nuclei in a straight line, with three electrons orbiting in a circle around the central nucleus. He believed that H^{+}_{3} would be unstable, but that reacting H^{−}_{2} with H^{+} could yield neutral H_{3}. Stanley Allen's structure was in the shape of a hexagon with alternating electrons and nuclei.

In 1916 Arthur Dempster showed that H_{3} gas was unstable, but at the same time also confirmed that the cation existed. In 1917 Gerald Wendt and William Duane discovered that hydrogen gas subjected to alpha particles shrank in volume and thought that diatomic hydrogen was converted to triatomic. After this researchers thought that active hydrogen could be the triatomic form. Joseph Lévine went so far as to postulate that low pressure systems on the Earth happened due to triatomic hydrogen high in the atmosphere. In 1920 Wendt and Landauer named the substance "Hyzone" in analogy to ozone and its extra reactivity over normal hydrogen. Earlier Gottfried Wilhelm Osann believed he had discovered a form of hydrogen analogous to ozone which he called "Ozonwasserstoff". It was made by electrolysis of dilute sulfuric acid. In those days no one knew that ozone was triatomic so he did not announce triatomic hydrogen. This was later shown to be a mixture with sulfur dioxide, and not a new form of hydrogen.

In the 1930s active hydrogen was found to be hydrogen with hydrogen sulfide contamination, and scientists stopped believing in triatomic hydrogen. Quantum mechanical calculations showed that neutral H_{3} was unstable but that ionised H^{+}_{3} could exist. When the concept of isotopes came along, people such as Bohr then thought there may be an eka-hydrogen with atomic weight 3. This idea was later proven with the existence of tritium, but that was not the explanation of why molecular weight 3 was observed in mass spectrometers. J. J. Thomson later believed that the molecular weight 3 molecule he observed was Hydrogen deuteride. In the Orion Nebula lines were observed that were attributed to nebulium which could have been the new element eka-hydrogen, especially when its atomic weight was calculated as near 3. Later this was shown to be ionised nitrogen and oxygen.

Gerhard Herzberg was the first to actually observe the spectrum of neutral H_{3}, and this triatomic molecule was the first to have a Rydberg spectrum measured where its own ground state was unstable.

== See also ==
- F. M. Devienne, one of the first to have studied the energy properties of Triatomic hydrogen
