= Hydron =

Monocationic atomic hydrogen, H+

Names
- Systematic IUPAC name Hydron (substitutive); Hydrogen(1+) (additive)
- Other names Proton (Hydrogen-1 only)

Identifiers
CAS Number	12408-02-5
3D model (JSmol)	Interactive image
ChEBI	CHEBI:15378
ChemSpider	1010
IUPHAR/BPS	2346
KEGG	C00080
PubChem CID	1038
UNII	5046UKT60S
CompTox Dashboard (EPA)	DTXSID50924722
- InChI: InChI=1S/p+1 Key: GPRLSGONYQIRFK-UHFFFAOYSA-N
- SMILES: [H+]

Properties
Chemical formula	H^{+}
Molar mass	1.007 g·mol^{−1}

Thermochemistry
Std molar entropy (S^{⦵}_{298})	108.95 J K^{−1} mol^{−1}
- Except where otherwise noted, data are given for materials in their standard state (at 25 °C [77 °F], 100 kPa). Infobox references

In chemistry, the hydron, informally called the proton, is the cationic form of atomic hydrogen, represented with the symbol H^{+}. The general term "hydron", endorsed by IUPAC, encompasses cations of hydrogen regardless of isotope: thus it refers collectively to protons (^{1}H^{+}) for the protium isotope, deuterons (^{2}H^{+} or D^{+}) for the deuterium isotope, and tritons (^{3}H^{+} or T^{+}) for the tritium isotope.

Unlike most other ions, the hydron consists only of a bare atomic nucleus. The negatively charged counterpart of the hydron is the hydride anion, H^{−}.

== Properties ==
=== Solute properties ===
Other things being equal, compounds that readily donate hydrons (Brønsted acids, see below) are generally polar, hydrophilic solutes and are often soluble in solvents with high relative static permittivity (dielectric constants). Examples include organic acids like acetic acid (CH_{3}COOH) or methanesulfonic acid (CH_{3}SO_{3}H). However, large nonpolar portions of the molecule may attenuate these properties. Thus, as a result of its alkyl chain, octanoic acid (C_{7}H_{15}COOH) is considerably less hydrophilic compared to acetic acid.

The unsolvated hydron (a completely free or "naked" hydrogen atomic nucleus) does not exist in the condensed (liquid or solid) phase. As the surface electric field strength is inverse to the radius, a tiny nucleus interacts thousands times stronger with nearby electrons than any partly ionized atom.

Although superacids are sometimes said to owe their extraordinary hydron-donating power to the presence of "free hydrons", such a statement is misleading: even for a source of "free hydrons" like H_{2}F^{+}, one of the superacidic cations present in the superacid fluoroantimonic acid (HF:SbF_{5}), detachment of a free H^{+} still comes at an enormous energetic penalty on the order of several hundred kcal/mol. This effectively rules out the possibility of the free hydron being present in solution. For this reason, in liquid strong acids, hydrons are believed to diffuse by sequential transfer from one molecule to the next along a network of hydrogen bonds through what is known as the Grotthuss mechanism.

=== Acidity ===
The hydron ion can incorporate an electron pair from a Lewis base into the molecule by adduction:

[H]^{+} + :L → [HL]^{+}

Because of this capture of the Lewis base (L), the hydron ion has Lewis acidic character. In terms of Hard/Soft Acid Base (HSAB) theory, the bare hydron is an infinitely hard Lewis acid.

The hydron plays a central role in Brønsted–Lowry acid–base theory: a species that behaves as a hydron donor in a reaction is known as the Brønsted acid, while the species accepting the hydron is known as the Brønsted base. In the generic acid–base reaction shown below, HA is the acid, while B (shown with a lone pair) is the base:

HA + :B → [HB]^{+} + :A^{–}

The hydrated form of the hydrogen cation, the hydronium (hydroxonium) ion H_{3}O^{+}(aq), is a key object of Arrhenius' definition of acid. Other hydrated forms, the Zundel cation H_{5}O^{+}_{2}, which is formed from a proton and two water molecules, and the Eigen cation H_{9}O^{+}_{4}, which is formed from a hydronium ion and three water molecules, are theorized to play an important role in the diffusion of protons though an aqueous solution according to the Grotthuss mechanism. Although the ion H_{3}O^{+}(aq) is often shown in introductory textbooks to emphasize that the hydron is never present as an unsolvated species in aqueous solution, it is somewhat misleading, as it oversimplifies infamously complex speciation of the solvated proton in water; the notation H^{+}(aq) is often preferred, since it conveys aqueous solvation while remaining noncommittal with respect to the number of water molecules involved.

== Isotopes of hydron ==
1. Proton, having the symbol p or ^{1}H^{+}, is the +1 ion of protium, ^{1}H.
2. Deuteron, having the symbol ^{2}H^{+} or D^{+}, is the +1 ion of deuterium, ^{2}H or D.
3. Triton, having the symbol ^{3}H^{+} or T^{+}, is the +1 ion of tritium, ^{3}H or T.

Other isotopes of hydrogen are too unstable to be relevant in chemistry.

== History of the term ==
The term "hydron" is recommended by IUPAC to be used instead of "proton" if no distinction is made between the isotopes proton, deuteron and triton, all found in naturally occurring isotope mixtures. The name "proton" refers to isotopically pure ^{1}H^{+}. On the other hand, calling the hydron simply hydrogen ion is not recommended because hydrogen anions also exist.

The term "hydron" was defined by IUPAC in 1988. Traditionally, the term "proton" was and is used in place of "hydron". The latter term is generally only used in the context where comparisons between the various isotopes of hydrogen is important (as in the kinetic isotope effect or hydrogen isotopic labeling). Otherwise, referring to hydrons as protons is still considered acceptable, for example in such terms as protonation, deprotonation, proton pump, or proton channel. The transfer of H^{+} in an acid-base reaction is usually referred to as proton transfer. Acid and bases are referred to as proton donors and acceptors correspondingly.

99.9844% of natural hydrons (hydrogen nuclei) are protons, and the remainder (about 156 per million in sea water) are deuterons (see deuterium), except for some very rare natural tritons (see tritium).

== See also ==
- Deprotonation
- Dihydrogen cation
- Hydrogen ion cluster
- Solvated electron
- Superacid
- Trihydrogen cation
- Proton emission
