= IRAS 08572+3915 =

Galaxy in the constellation Lynx

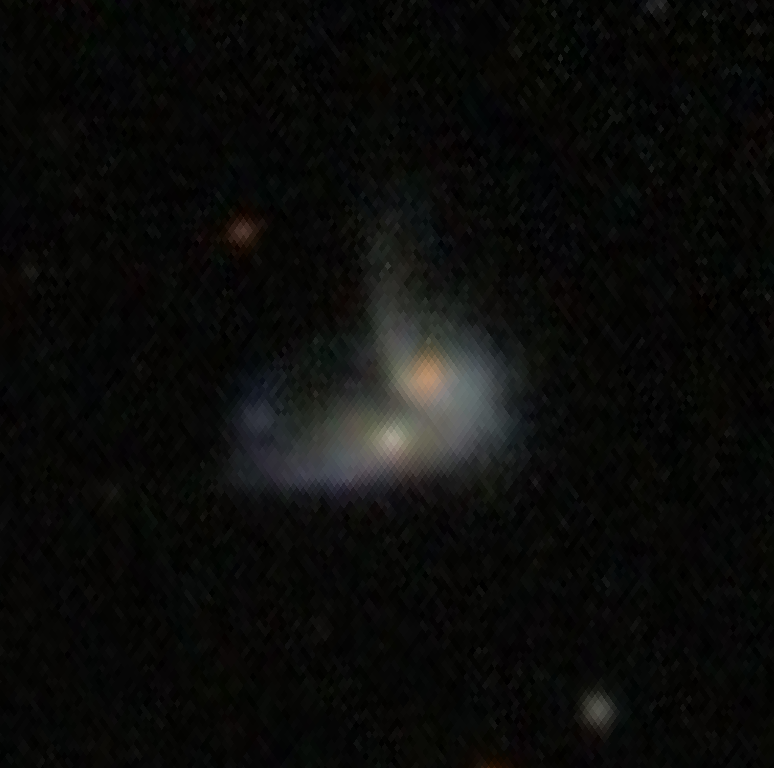
- SDSS image of IRAS 08572+3915

Observation data (J2000 epoch)
- Constellation: Lynx
- Right ascension: 09^{h} 00^{m} 25.38^{s}
- Declination: +39° 03′ 54.29″
- Redshift: 0.058199
- Heliocentric radial velocity: 17,447 ± 3 km/s
- Distance: 849.5 ± 59.5 Mly (260.46 ± 18.23 Mpc)
- Apparent magnitude (B): 16.80

Characteristics
- Type: LINER / Sy2 ULIRG

Other designations
- C-GOALS 08, IRAS F08572+3915, PGC 25295, NVSS J090025+390352, IRAS F08572+3915 ID

IRAS 08572+3915 are a pair of interacting galaxies located in the constellation of Lynx. The redshift of the pair is (z) 0.058 and it was first discovered by G.H. Rieke in August 1988. It is also classified as an ultraluminous infrared galaxy based on several observations.

== Description ==
IRAS 08572+3915 is made up of two separate spiral galaxies (IRAS 08572+3915NW and IRAS 08572+3915SW) in the process of merging with each other. The two nuclei of the galaxies are estimated to be only six kiloparsecs from each other. Imaging made with Hubble Space Telescope (HST) found these nuclei have tidal tails emerging from both directions and are each measured 30 and 15 kiloparsecs long in terms of length. A bridge of tidal material is shown linking both nuclei. Star forming clusters of young massive stars are detected in nuclear regions and also the tidal tails, with the estimated ages of the stars ranging from 5.5 to 6 million years, each having a mass of 10^{6} M_{☉}. The optical spectrum of IRAS 08572+3915 has characteristics of both LINER and H II features. As a whole, the total star formation rate is estimated as 69 M_{☉} per year.

The radio structure of the whole interacting galaxy system displays a flat radio spectrum observed between the frequencies of 1.4 and 5 GHz, with the entire spectrum shown steeping when reaching above 5 GHz. A bright central component is shown unresolved and dominating most of the source based on both radio and mid-infrared images.

An observation also found the nucleus on the northwest component of the galaxy is reddened and shines more brighter as compared to the nucleus on the southwest component. There is also a possibility that it also hosts an obscured quasar nucleus given most of the infrared emission is emitted out from within an unresolved region. In additional, the northwestern galaxy is also the source of galactic outflows with molecular gas showing blueshifted velocities that reaches up to 1100 kilometers per seconds. Both carbon oxide absorption lines and trihydrogen cations were detected in the galaxy. The whole galaxy has a detached additional component depicted as a gas blob with a mass of around 5 × 10^{7} M_{☉}. Based on observations, the gas blob is moving away with a velocity of 900 kilometers per seconds, suggestive of the galaxy's previous AGN history.
