= Uranus =

Seventh planet from the Sun

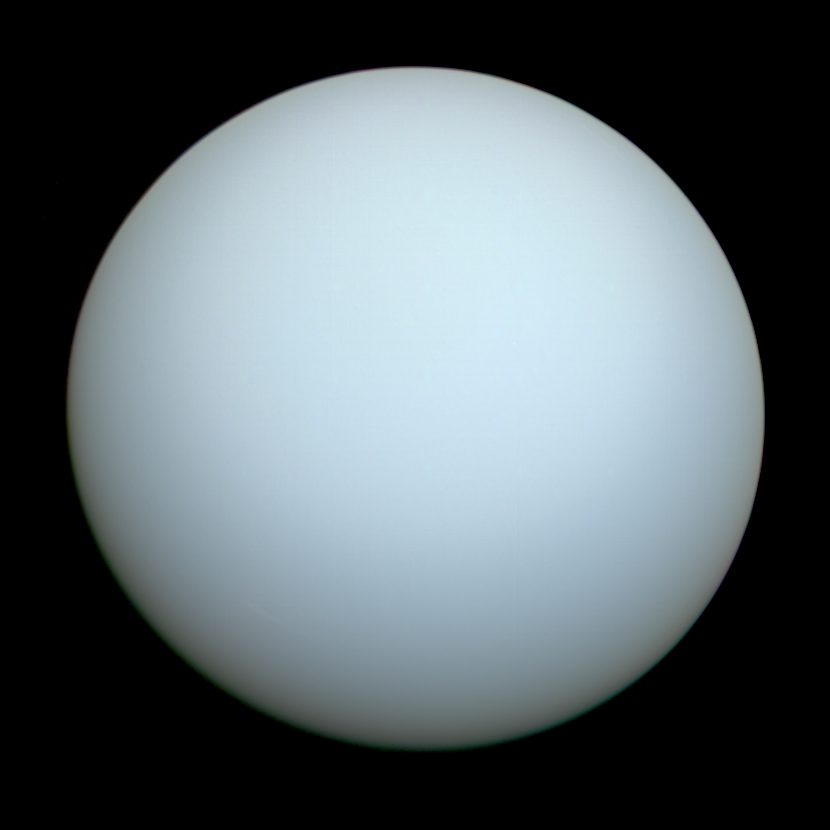
- Uranus in true colour, (Note: Based on Irwin, Patrick G J; Dobinson, Jack; James, Arjuna; Teanby, Nicholas A; Simon, Amy A; Fletcher, Leigh N; Roman, Michael T; Orton, Glenn S; Wong, Michael H; Toledo, Daniel; Pérez-Hoyos, Santiago; Beck, Julie (23 December 2023). "Modelling the seasonal cycle of Uranus's colour and magnitude, and comparison with Neptune". Monthly Notices of the Royal Astronomical Society. 527 (4): 11521–11538. doi:10.1093/mnras/stad3761. hdl:20.500.11850/657542. ISSN 0035-8711.) as captured by Voyager 2 on January 24, 1986. Its pale, muted appearance is due to a shroud of haze above its clouds.

Discovery
- Discovered by: William Herschel
- Discovery date: 13 March 1781

Designations
- Pronunciation: /ˈjʊərənəs/ or /jʊˈreɪnəs/
- Named after: the Latin form Ūranus of the Greek god Οὐρανός Ouranos
- Adjectives: Uranian (/jʊˈreɪniən/)
- Symbol: ,

Orbital characteristics (Note: These are the mean elements from VSOP87, together with derived quantities.)
- Epoch J2000
- Aphelion: 20.0965 AU (3.00639 billion km)
- Perihelion: 18.2861 AU (2.73556 billion km)
- Semi-major axis: 19.19126 AU (2.870972 billion km)
- Eccentricity: 0.04717
- Orbital period (sidereal): 84.0205 yr; 30,688.5 d; 42,718 Uranian solar days
- Orbital period (synodic): 369.66 days
- Average orbital speed: 6.80 km/s
- Mean anomaly: 142.238600°
- Inclination: 0.773° to ecliptic; 6.48° to Sun's equator; 0.99° to invariable plane
- Longitude of ascending node: 74.006°
- Time of perihelion: 17–19 August 2050
- Argument of perihelion: 96.998857°
- Known satellites: 29

Physical characteristics
- Mean radius: 25,362±7 km (Note: Refers to the level of 1 bar atmospheric pressure.)
- Equatorial radius: 25556.6 km
- Polar radius: 24968.5±0.4 km
- Flattening: 0.0229±0.0008 (Note: Calculated using data from Seidelmann, 2007.)
- Circumference: 159,354.1 km
- Surface area: 8.1156×10^{9} km^{2} 15.91 Earths
- Volume: 6.833×10^{13} km^{3} 63.086 Earths
- Mass: (8.68099±0.00040)×10^{25} kg 14.536 Earths; GM=5,793,939±13 km^{3}/s^{2}
- Mean density: 1.270±0.001 g/cm^{3} (Note: Based on the volume within the level of 1 bar atmospheric pressure.)
- Surface gravity: 8.69 m/s^{2} (0.886 g_{0})
- Moment of inertia factor: 0.23 (estimate)
- Escape velocity: 21.3 km/s
- Synodic rotation period: −0.718649 d −17^{h} 14^{m} 51^{s} (retrograde)
- Sidereal rotation period: −0.718661 d −17^{h} 14^{m} 52.310^{s} ± 0.036^{s} (retrograde)
- Equatorial rotation velocity: 2.59 km/s
- Axial tilt: 82.23° (to orbit, retrograde). 97.77°(prograde, right-hand rule)
- North pole right ascension: 17^{h} 9^{m} 15^{s} 257.311°
- North pole declination: −15.175°
- Albedo: 0.300 (Bond); 0.488 (geom.)
Surface temp.	min	mean	max
1 bar level		76 K (−197.2 °C)
0.1 bar (tropopause)	47 K	53 K	57 K
- Apparent magnitude: 5.38 to 6.03
- Absolute magnitude (H): −7.2
- Angular diameter: 3.3″ to 4.1″

Atmosphere (Note: Calculation of He, H_{2} and CH_{4} molar fractions is based on a 2.3% mixing ratio of methane to hydrogen and the 15/85 He/H_{2} proportions measured at the tropopause.)
- Scale height: 27.7 km
- Composition by volume: Below 1.3 bar (130 kPa): 83 ± 3% hydrogen; 15 ± 3% helium; 2.3% methane; 0.009% (0.007–0.015%) hydrogen deuteride; hydrogen sulphide (trace amount); Icy volatiles: ammonia; water ice; ammonium hydrosulfide; methane hydrate

Uranus is the seventh planet from the Sun. It is a gaseous cyan-coloured ice giant. Most of the planet is made of water, ammonia, and methane in a supercritical phase of matter, which astronomers call "ice" or "volatiles". The planet's atmosphere has a complex layered cloud structure, and has the lowest minimum temperature (49 K (−224 °C; −371 °F)) of all of the Solar System's planets. It has a marked axial tilt of 82.23°, with a retrograde rotation period of 17 hours and 14 minutes. This means that in an 84-Earth-year orbital period around the Sun, its poles get around 42 years of continuous sunlight, followed by 42 years of continuous darkness.

Uranus has the third-largest diameter and fourth-largest mass among the Solar System's planets. Based on current models, inside its volatile mantle layer is a rocky core, and a thick hydrogen and helium atmosphere surrounds it. Trace amounts of hydrocarbons (thought to be produced via hydrolysis) and carbon monoxide along with carbon dioxide (thought to have originated from comets) have been detected in the upper atmosphere. There are many unexplained climate phenomena in Uranus's atmosphere, such as its peak wind speed of 900 km/h (560 mph), variations in its polar cap, and its erratic cloud formation. The planet also has very low internal heat compared to other giant planets, the cause of which remains unclear.

Like the other giant planets, Uranus has a ring system, a magnetosphere, and many natural satellites. The extremely dark ring system reflects only about 2% of the incoming light. Uranus's 29 natural satellites include 19 known regular moons, of which 14 are small inner moons. Further out are the larger five major moons of the planet: Miranda, Ariel, Umbriel, Titania, and Oberon. Orbiting at a much greater distance from Uranus are the ten known irregular moons. The planet's magnetosphere is highly asymmetric and has many charged particles, which may be the cause of the darkening of its rings and moons.

Uranus is visible to the naked eye, but it is very dim and moves very slowly relative to the background stars and was not classified as a planet until 1781, when it was first observed by William Herschel. About seven decades after its discovery, consensus was reached that the planet be named after the Greek god Uranus (Ouranos), one of the Greek primordial deities. As of 2026, it has been visited only once when in 1986 the Voyager 2 probe flew by the planet. Though nowadays it can be resolved and observed by telescopes, there is much desire to revisit the planet, as shown by Planetary Science Decadal Survey's decision to make the proposed Uranus Orbiter and Probe mission a top priority in the 2023–2032 survey, and the CNSA's proposal to fly by the planet with a subprobe of Tianwen-4.

== History ==
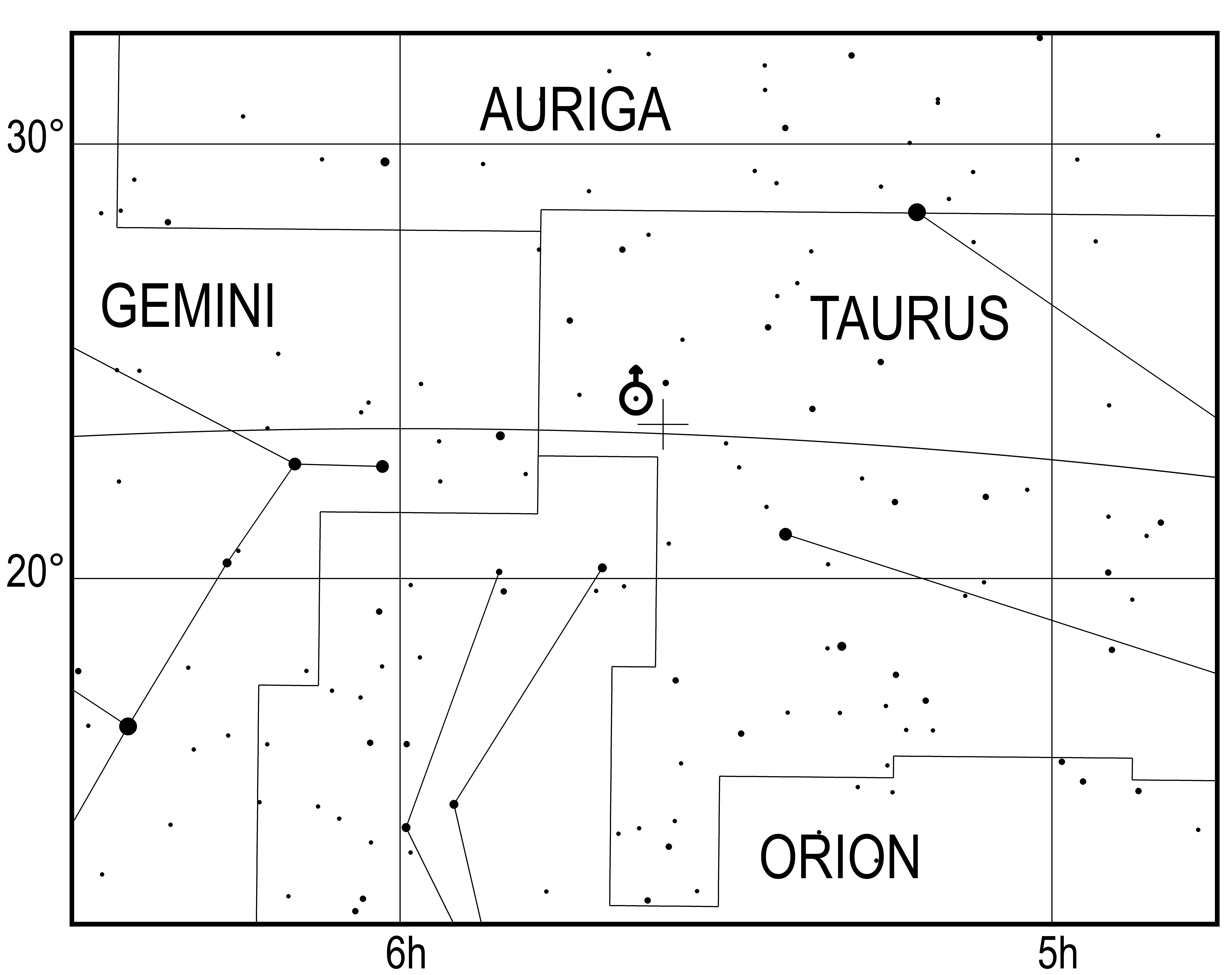
Position of Uranus (marked with a cross) on 13 March 1781, the date of its discovery

Like the classical planets, Uranus is visible to the naked eye, but it was never recognised as a planet by ancient observers because of its dimness and slow orbit. William Herschel first observed Uranus on 13 March 1781, leading to its discovery as a planet, expanding the known boundaries of the Solar System for the first time in history and making Uranus the first planet classified as such with the aid of a telescope. The discovery of Uranus also effectively doubled the size of the known Solar System because Uranus is around twice as far from the Sun as the planet Saturn.

=== Discovery ===
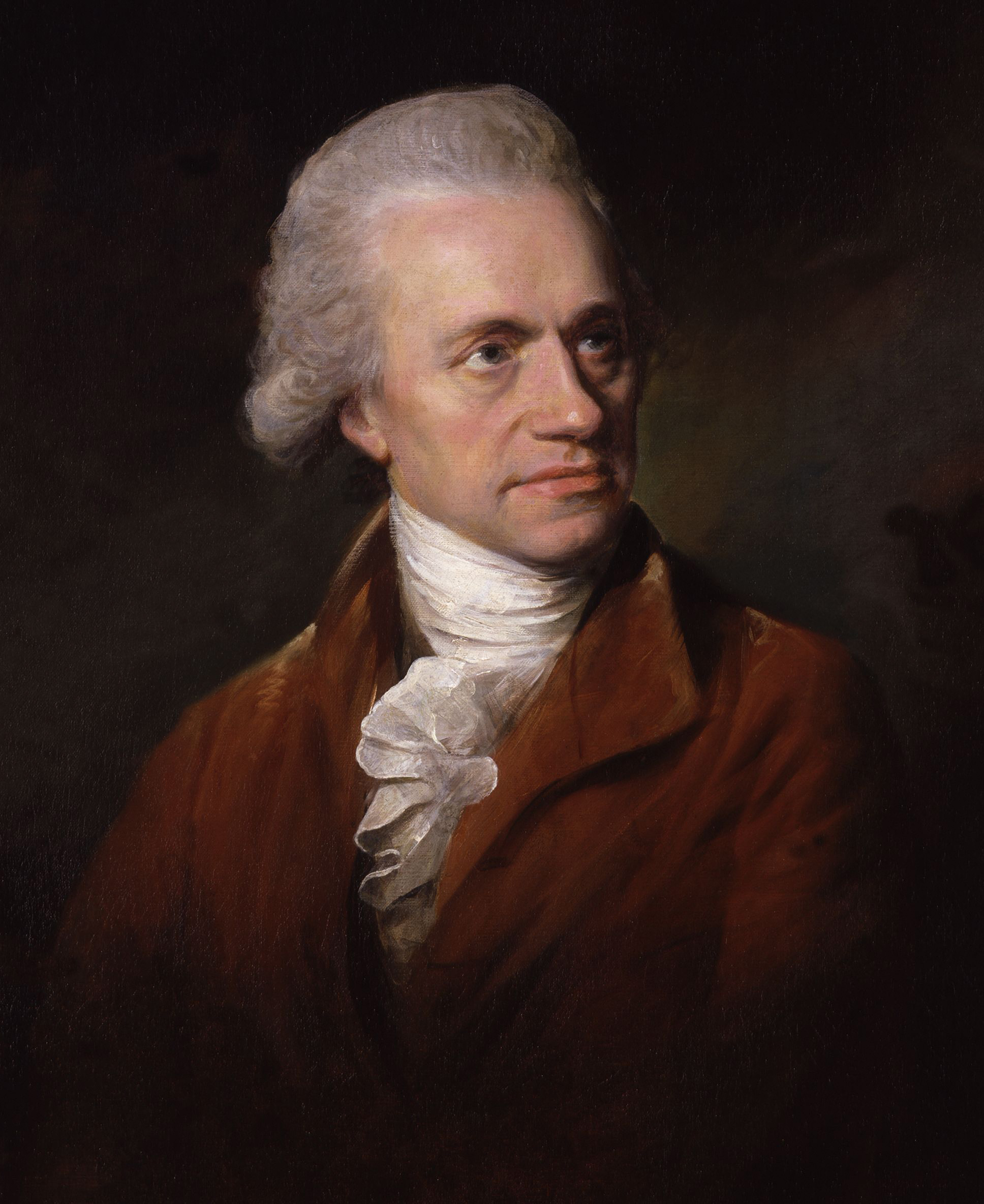
William Herschel, discoverer of Uranus

Before its recognition as a planet, Uranus had been observed many times, but was generally misidentified as a star. It was apparently observed by Hipparchus, who measured the positions of stars in 128 BC for his catalog that was later incorporated into Ptolemy's Almagest. The catalog gives the positions of four stars forming a quadrilateral in Virgo. One of the four stars does not exist, but Uranus was at that position in April of 128 BC. The earliest definite sighting was in 1690, when John Flamsteed observed it at least six times, cataloguing it as 34 Tauri. James Bradley observed it three times, in 1748, 1750, and 1753. Tobias Mayer observed it once in 1756. The French astronomer Pierre Charles Le Monnier observed Uranus at least twelve times between 1750 and 1769, including on four consecutive nights.

William Herschel observed Uranus on 13 March 1781 from the garden of his house at 19 New King Street in Bath, Somerset, England (now the Herschel Museum of Astronomy), and initially reported it (on 26 April 1781) as a comet. With a homemade 6.2-inch reflecting telescope, Herschel "engaged in a series of observations on the parallax of the fixed stars."

Herschel recorded in his journal: "In the quartile near ζ Tauri ... either [a] Nebulous star or perhaps a comet." On 17 March he noted: "I looked for the Comet or Nebulous Star and found that it is a Comet, for it has changed its place." When he reported his discovery to the Royal Society, he continued to assert that he had found a comet, but also implicitly compared it to a planet:

The power [of the eyepiece] I had on when I first saw the comet was 227. From experience I know that the diameters of the fixed stars are not proportionally magnified with higher powers, as planets are; therefore I now put the [eyepieces with] powers at 460 and 932, and found that the diameter of the comet increased in proportion to the power, as it ought to be, on the supposition of its not being a fixed star, while the diameters of the stars to which I compared it were not increased in the same ratio. Moreover, the comet being magnified much beyond what its light would admit of, appeared hazy and ill-defined with these great powers, while the stars preserved that lustre and distinctness which from many thousand observations I knew they would retain. The sequel has shown that my surmises were well-founded, this proving to be the Comet we have lately observed.

Herschel notified the Astronomer Royal, Nevil Maskelyne, of his discovery and received this flummoxed reply from him on 23 April 1781: "I don't know what to call it. It is as likely to be a regular planet moving in an orbit nearly circular to the sun as a Comet moving in a very eccentric ellipsis. I have not yet seen any coma or tail to it."

Although Herschel continued to describe his new object as a comet, other astronomers had already begun to suspect otherwise. The Finnish-Swedish astronomer Anders Johan Lexell, working in Russia, was the first to compute the orbit of the new object. Its nearly circular orbit suggested that it was a planet rather than a comet. The Berlin astronomer Johann Elert Bode described Herschel's discovery as "a moving star that can be deemed a hitherto unknown planet-like object circulating beyond the orbit of Saturn". Bode concluded that its near-circular orbit was more like a planet's than a comet's.

The object was soon accepted as a new planet. By 1783, Herschel acknowledged this to Royal Society president Joseph Banks: "By the observation of the most eminent Astronomers in Europe it appears that the new star, which I had the honour of pointing out to them in March 1781, is a Primary Planet of our Solar System." In recognition of his achievement, King George III gave Herschel an annual stipend of £200 (equivalent to £26,000 in 2025) on condition that he move to Windsor so that the Royal Family could look through his telescopes.

=== Name ===
The name Uranus references the ancient Greek deity of the sky Uranus (Ancient Greek: Οὐρανός), known as Caelus in Roman mythology, the father of Cronus (Saturn), grandfather of Zeus (Jupiter) and great-grandfather of Ares (Mars), which was rendered as Uranus in Latin (IPA: [ˈuːranʊs]). It is the only one of the eight planets whose English name derives from a figure of Greek mythology. The pronunciation of the name Uranus preferred among astronomers is /ˈjʊərənəs/ YOOR-ə-nəs, with the long u of English and stress on the first syllable as in Latin Uranus, in contrast to /jʊˈreɪnəs/ yuu-RAY-nəs, with stress on the second syllable and a long a, though both are considered acceptable. Because, in the English-speaking world, the latter sounds like "your anus", the former pronunciation also saves embarrassment: as Pamela Gay, an astronomer at Southern Illinois University Edwardsville, noted on her podcast, to avoid "being made fun of by any small schoolchildren ... when in doubt, don't emphasise anything and just say /ˈjʊərənəs/. And then run, quickly."

Consensus on the name was not reached until almost 70 years after the planet's discovery. During the original discussions following discovery, Maskelyne asked Herschel to "do the astronomical world the faver [sic] to give a name to your planet, which is entirely your own, [and] which we are so much obliged to you for the discovery of". In response to Maskelyne's request, Herschel decided to name the object Georgium Sidus (George's Star), or the "Georgian Planet", in honour of his new patron, King George III. He explained this decision in a letter to Joseph Banks:

In the fabulous ages of ancient times the appellations of Mercury, Venus, Mars, Jupiter and Saturn were given to the Planets, as being the names of their principal heroes and divinities. In the present more philosophical era it would hardly be allowable to have recourse to the same method and call it Juno, Pallas, Apollo or Minerva, for a name to our new heavenly body. The first consideration of any particular event, or remarkable incident, seems to be its chronology: if in any future age it should be asked, when this last-found Planet was discovered? It would be a very satisfactory answer to say, 'In the reign of King George the Third'.

Herschel's proposed name was not popular outside Britain and Hanover, and alternatives were soon proposed. The astronomer Jérôme Lalande proposed that it be named Herschel in honour of its discoverer. The Swedish astronomer Erik Prosperin proposed the names Astraea, Cybele (now the names of asteroids), and Neptune, which later became the name of the next planet to be discovered. Georg Lichtenberg from Göttingen also supported Astraea (as Austräa), but she is traditionally associated with Virgo instead of Taurus. Neptune was supported by other astronomers who liked the idea of commemorating the victories of the British Royal Naval fleet in the course of the American Revolutionary War by calling the new planet either Neptune George III or Neptune Great Britain, a compromise Lexell suggested as well. Daniel Bernoulli suggested Hypercronius and Transaturnis. Minerva was also proposed.

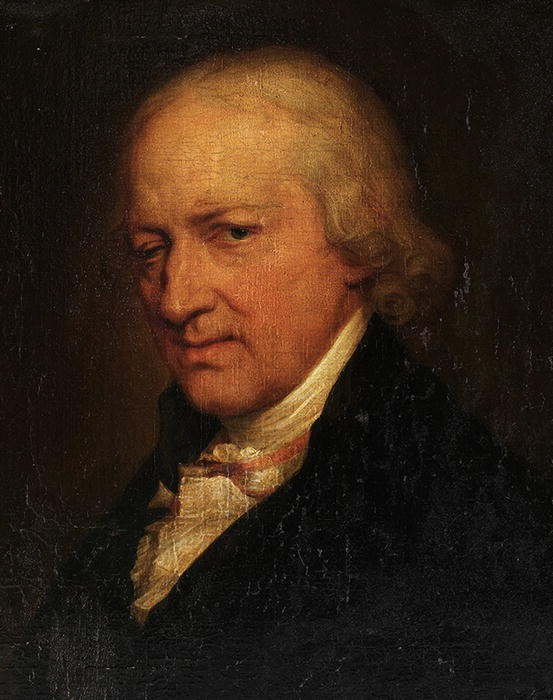
Johann Elert Bode, the astronomer who suggested the name Uranus

In a March 1782 treatise, Johann Elert Bode proposed Uranus, the Latinised version of the Greek god of the sky, Ouranos. Bode argued that the name should follow the mythology so as not to stand out as different from the other planets, and that Uranus was an appropriate name as the father of the first generation of the Titans. He also noted the elegance of the name in that just as Saturn was the father of Jupiter, the new planet should be named after the father of Saturn. However, he was apparently unaware that Uranus was only the Latinised form of the deity's name, and the Roman equivalent was Caelus. In 1789, Bode's Royal Academy colleague Martin Klaproth named his newly discovered element uranium in support of Bode's choice. Ultimately, Bode's suggestion became the most widely used, and became universal in 1850 when HM Nautical Almanac Office, the final holdout, switched from using Georgium Sidus to Uranus.

Uranus has two astronomical symbols. The first to be proposed, ⛢, (Note: Cf. (not supported by all fonts)) was proposed by Johann Gottfried Köhler at Bode's request in 1782. Köhler suggested that the new planet be given the symbol for platinum, which had been described scientifically only 30 years before. As there was no alchemical symbol for platinum, he suggested ⛢ or ⛢, a combination of the planetary-metal symbols ☉ (gold) and ♂ (iron), as platinum (or 'white gold') is found mixed with iron. Bode thought that an upright orientation, ⛢, fit better with the symbols for the other planets while remaining distinct. This symbol predominates in modern astronomical use in the rare cases that symbols are used at all. The second symbol, ♅, (Note: Cf. (not supported by all fonts)) was suggested by Lalande in 1784. In a letter to Herschel, Lalande described it as "un globe surmonté par la première lettre de votre nom" ("a globe surmounted by the first letter of your surname"). The second symbol is nearly universal in astrology.

Uranus is called by a variety of names in other languages. Uranus's name is literally translated as the "Heavenly King star" in Chinese (天王星; Tiānwángxīng), Japanese (天王星 Tennōsei), Korean (천왕성 Cheonwangseong), and Vietnamese (sao Thiên Vương). In Thai, its official name is Dao Yurenat (ดาวยูเรนัส), as in English. Its other name in Thai is Dao Maruettayu (ดาวมฤตยู, Star of Mṛtyu), after the Sanskrit word for 'death', Mrtyu (मृत्यु). In Mongolian, its name is Tengeriin Van (Тэнгэрийн ван), translated as 'King of the Sky', reflecting its namesake god's role as the ruler of the heavens. In Hawaiian, its name is Heleʻekela, the Hawaiian rendering of the name 'Herschel'.

== Formation ==
It is argued that the differences between the ice giants and the gas giants arise from their formation history. The Solar System is hypothesised to have formed from a rotating disk of gas and dust known as the presolar nebula. Much of the nebula's gas, primarily hydrogen and helium, formed the Sun, and the dust grains collected together to form the first protoplanets. As the planets grew, some of them eventually accreted enough matter for their gravity to hold on to the nebula's leftover gas. The more gas they held onto, the larger they became; the larger they became, the more gas they held onto until a critical point was reached, and their size began to increase exponentially. The ice giants, with only a few Earth masses of nebular gas, never reached that critical point. Recent simulations of planetary migration have suggested that both ice giants formed closer to the Sun than their present positions, and moved outwards after formation (the Nice model).

== Orbit and rotation ==
Uranus orbits the Sun once every 84 years. As viewed against the background of stars, since being discovered in 1781, the planet has returned to the point of its discovery northeast of the binary star Zeta Tauri twice—in March 1865 and March 1949—and will return to this location again in April 2033.

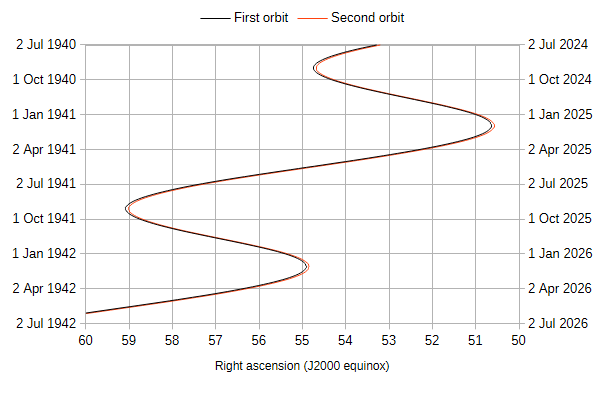
Right ascension of Uranus in two 2-year intervals, 84 years apart

Because the period is very close to 84 years, its apparent position in the stars is very close to what it was exactly 84 years earlier (see graph). The retrograde motion of Uranus brings it back each year to approximately the most easterly position it had the previous year.

Its average distance from the Sun is roughly 20 AU (3 billion km; 2 billion mi). The difference between its minimum and maximum distance from the Sun is 1.8 AU, larger than that of any other planet, though not as large as that of dwarf planet Pluto. The intensity of sunlight varies inversely with the square of the distance—on Uranus (at about 20 times the distance from the Sun compared to Earth), it is about 1/400 the intensity of light on Earth.

The orbital elements of Uranus were first calculated in 1783 by Pierre-Simon Laplace. With time, discrepancies began to appear between predicted and observed orbits, and in 1841, John Couch Adams first proposed that the differences might be due to the gravitational tug of an unseen planet. In 1845, Urbain Le Verrier began his own independent research into Uranus's orbit. On 23 September 1846, Johann Gottfried Galle located a new planet, later named Neptune, at nearly the position predicted by Le Verrier.

The rotational period of the interior of Uranus is 17 hours, 14 minutes, and 52 seconds which was determined by tracking the rotational motion of Uranus's aurorae. As on all giant planets, its upper atmosphere experiences strong winds in the direction of rotation. At some latitudes, such as about 60 degrees south, visible features of the atmosphere move much faster, making a full rotation in as little as 14 hours.

=== Axial tilt ===
Simulated Earth view of Uranus from 1986 to 2030, from southern summer solstice in 1986 to equinox in 2007 and northern summer solstice in 2028.

The Uranian axis of rotation is approximately parallel to the plane of the Solar System, with an axial tilt that can be described either as 82.23° or as 97.77°, depending on which pole is considered north. (Note: To match the description on the page Axial tilt, 82.23° and not 97.77° is used throughout this page. See the following explanation.) The former follows the International Astronomical Union definition that the north pole is the pole which lies on Earth's North Pole's side of the invariable plane of the Solar System. Uranus has retrograde rotation when defined this way. Alternatively, the convention in which a body's north and south poles are defined according to the right-hand rule in relation to the direction of rotation, Uranus's axial tilt may be given instead as 97.77°, which reverses which pole is considered north and which is considered south, giving the planet prograde rotation. This gives it seasonal changes completely unlike those of the other planets. Pluto and asteroid 2 Pallas also have extreme axial tilts. Near the solstice, one pole faces the Sun continuously and the other faces away, with only a narrow strip around the equator experiencing a rapid day–night cycle, with the Sun low over the horizon. On the other side of Uranus's orbit, the orientation of the poles towards the Sun is reversed. Each pole gets around 42 years of continuous sunlight, followed by 42 years of darkness. Near the time of the equinoxes, the Sun faces the equator of Uranus, giving a period of day–night cycles similar to those seen on most of the other planets.

One result of this axis orientation is that, averaged over the Uranian year, the near-polar regions of Uranus receive a greater energy input from the Sun than its equatorial regions. Nevertheless, Uranus is hotter at its equator than at its poles. The underlying mechanism that causes this is unknown. The cause of Uranus's unusual axial tilt is also not known with certainty, but the usual speculation is that during the formation of the Solar System, an Earth-sized protoplanet collided with Uranus, causing the skewed orientation. Research by Jacob Kegerreis of Durham University suggests that the tilt resulted from a protoplanet larger than Earth crashing into the planet 3 to 4 billion years ago. Uranus's south pole was pointed almost directly at the Sun at the time of Voyager 2's flyby in 1986.

Uranus's unusual axis of rotation had been surmised by astronomers since Herschel's discovery of Titania and Oberon, with Laplace calculating the inclination of the moons' orbits to the planet's equatorial plane in 1805.

List of solstices and equinoxes
Northern hemisphere	Year	Southern hemisphere
Winter solstice	1902, 1986, 2069	Summer solstice
Vernal equinox	1923, 2007, 2092	Autumnal equinox
Summer solstice	1944, 2028	Winter solstice
Autumnal equinox	1965, 2050	Vernal equinox

=== Visibility from Earth ===
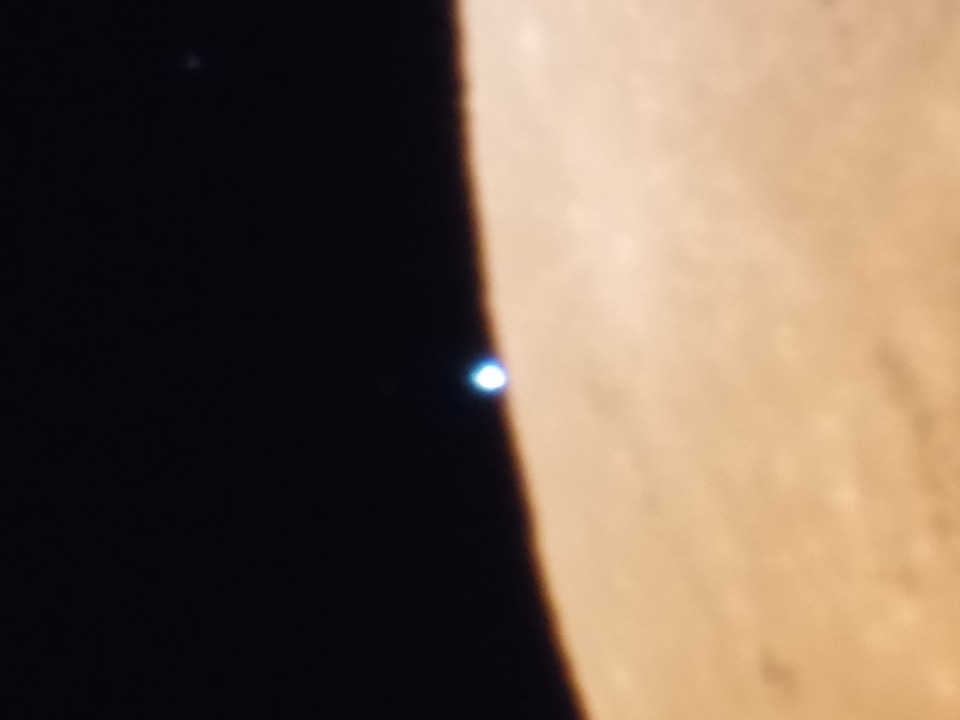
Uranus seen through an amateur telescope, shortly after lunar occultation, during the November 2022 lunar eclipse

The mean apparent magnitude of Uranus is 5.68, with a standard deviation of 0.17, while the extremes are 5.38 and 6.03. This range of brightness is near the limit of visibility to the unaided eye. Much of the variability is dependent upon the planetary latitudes being illuminated from the Sun and viewed from Earth. Its angular diameter is between 3.4 and 3.7 arcseconds, compared with 16 to 20 arcseconds for Saturn and 32 to 45 arcseconds for Jupiter. At opposition, Uranus is visible to the naked eye in dark skies, and becomes an easy target even in urban conditions with binoculars. On larger amateur telescopes with an objective diameter of between 15 and 23 cm, Uranus appears as a pale cyan disk with distinct limb darkening. With a large telescope of 25 cm or wider, cloud patterns, as well as some of the larger satellites, such as Titania and Oberon, may be visible.

== Internal structure ==
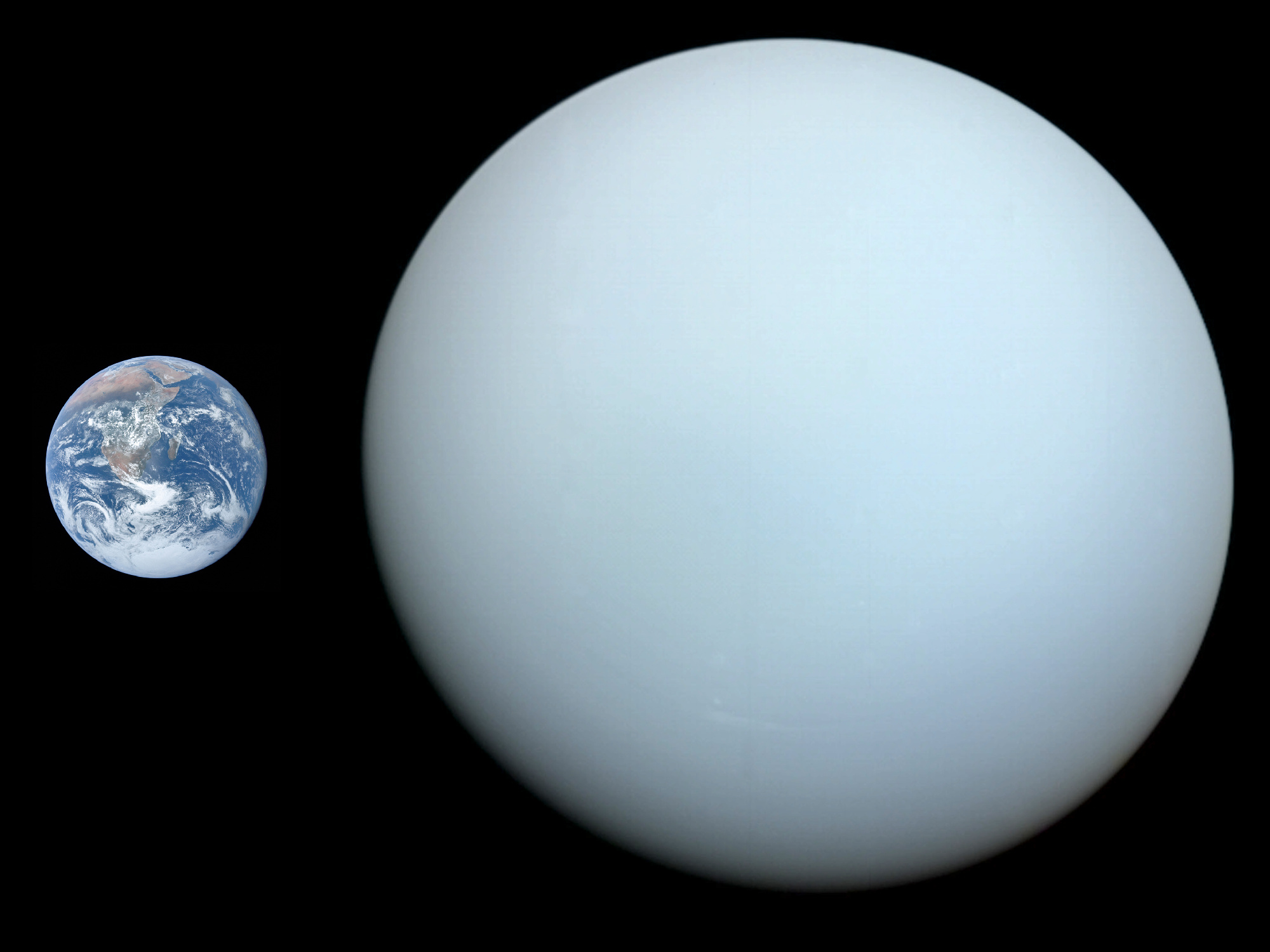
Size comparison of Earth and Uranus

Uranus's mass is roughly 14.5 times that of Earth, making it the least massive of the giant planets. Its diameter is slightly larger than Neptune's at roughly four times that of Earth. A resulting density of 1.27 g/cm^{3} makes Uranus the second least dense planet, after Saturn. This value indicates that it is made primarily of various ices, such as water, ammonia, and methane. The total mass of ice in Uranus's interior is not precisely known, because different figures emerge depending on the model chosen; it must be between 9.3 and 13.5 Earth masses. Hydrogen and helium constitute only a small part of the total, with between 0.5 and 1.5 Earth masses. The remainder of the non-ice mass (0.5 to 3.7 Earth masses) is accounted for by rocky material.

The standard model of Uranus's structure is that it consists of three layers: a rocky (silicate/iron–nickel) core in the centre, an icy mantle in the middle, and an outer gaseous hydrogen/helium envelope. The core is relatively small, with a mass of only 0.55 Earth masses and a radius less than 20% of the planet; the mantle comprises its bulk, with around 13.4 Earth masses, and the upper atmosphere is relatively insubstantial, weighing about 0.5 Earth masses and extending for the last 20% of Uranus's radius. Uranus's core density is around 9 g/cm^{3}, with a pressure in the centre of 8 million bars (800 GPa) and a temperature of about 5000 K. The ice mantle is not in fact composed of ice in the conventional sense, but of a hot and dense fluid consisting of water, ammonia and other volatiles. This fluid, which has a high electrical conductivity, is sometimes called a water–ammonia ocean.

Diagram of the interior of Uranus, listing each layer's composition

The extreme pressure and temperature deep within Uranus may break up the methane molecules, with the carbon atoms condensing into crystals of diamond that rain down through the mantle like hailstones. This phenomenon is similar to diamond rains that are theorised by scientists to exist on Jupiter, Saturn, and Neptune. Very-high-pressure experiments at the Lawrence Livermore National Laboratory suggest that an ocean of metallic liquid carbon, perhaps with floating solid 'diamond-bergs', may comprise the base of the mantle.

The bulk compositions of Uranus and Neptune are different from those of Jupiter and Saturn, with ice dominating over gases, hence justifying their separate classification as ice giants. There may be a layer of ionic water where the water molecules break down into a soup of hydrogen and oxygen ions, and deeper down superionic water in which the oxygen crystallises but the hydrogen ions move freely within the oxygen lattice.

Although the model considered above is reasonably standard, it is not unique; other models also satisfy observations. For instance, if substantial amounts of hydrogen and rocky material are mixed in the ice mantle, the total mass of ices in the interior will be lower, and, correspondingly, the total mass of rocks and hydrogen will be higher. Presently available data does not allow a scientific determination of which model is correct. The fluid interior structure of Uranus means that it has no solid surface. The gaseous atmosphere gradually transitions into the internal liquid layers. For the sake of convenience, a revolving oblate spheroid set at the point at which atmospheric pressure equals 1 bar (100 kPa) is conditionally designated as a "surface". It has equatorial and polar radii of 25,559 ± 4 km (15,881.6 ± 2.5 mi) and 24,973 ± 20 km (15,518 ± 12 mi), respectively. This surface is used throughout this article as a zero point for altitudes.

=== Internal heat ===
Uranus's internal heat appears markedly lower than that of the other giant planets; in astronomical terms, it has a low thermal flux. Why Uranus's internal temperature is so low is still not understood. Neptune, which is Uranus's near twin in size and composition, radiates 2.61 times as much energy into space as it receives from the Sun, but Uranus radiates hardly any excess heat at all. The total power radiated by Uranus in the far infrared (i.e. heat) part of the spectrum is 1.06±0.08 times the solar energy absorbed in its atmosphere. Uranus's heat flux is only 0.042±0.047 W/m^{2}, which is lower than the internal heat flux of Earth of about 0.075 W/m^{2}. The lowest temperature recorded in Uranus's tropopause is 49 K (−224.2 °C; −371.5 °F), making Uranus the coldest planet in the Solar System.

One of the hypotheses for this discrepancy suggests the Earth-sized impactor theorised to be behind Uranus's axial tilt left the planet with a depleted core temperature, as the impact caused Uranus to expel most of its primordial heat. Another hypothesis is that some form of barrier exists in Uranus's upper layers that prevents the core's heat from reaching the surface. For example, convection may take place in a set of compositionally different layers, which may inhibit upward heat transport; perhaps double diffusive convection is a limiting factor.

In a 2021 study, the ice giants' interior conditions were mimicked by compressing water that contained minerals such as olivine and ferropericlase, thus showing that large amounts of magnesium could be dissolved in the liquid interiors of Uranus and Neptune. If Uranus has more of this magnesium than Neptune, it could form a thermal insulation layer, thus potentially explaining the planet's low temperature.

== Atmosphere ==
Uranus's upper atmosphere imaged by HST during the Outer Planet Atmosphere Legacy (OPAL) observing programme, in visible and infrared light.

Although there is no well-defined solid surface within Uranus's interior, the outermost part of Uranus's gaseous envelope that is accessible to remote sensing is called its atmosphere. Remote-sensing capability extends down to roughly 300 km below the 1 bar (100 kPa) level, with a corresponding pressure around 100 bar (10 MPa) and temperature of 320 K (47 °C; 116 °F). The tenuous thermosphere extends over two planetary radii from the nominal surface, which is defined to lie at a pressure of 1 bar. The Uranian atmosphere can be divided into three layers: the troposphere, between altitudes of −300 and 50 km (−186 and 31 mi) and pressures from 100 to 0.1 bar (10 MPa to 10 kPa); the stratosphere, spanning altitudes between 50 and 4,000 km (31 and 2,485 mi) and pressures of between 0.1 and 10^{−10} bar (10 kPa to 10 μPa); and the thermosphere extending from 4,000 km to as high as 50,000 km from the surface. There is no mesosphere.

=== Composition ===
Diagram of the Uranus atmosphere's composition and layers, along with the graph of its pressure

The composition of Uranus's atmosphere is different from its bulk, consisting mainly of molecular hydrogen and helium. The helium molar fraction, i.e. the number of helium atoms per molecule of gas, is 0.15±0.03 in the upper troposphere, which corresponds to a mass fraction 0.26±0.05. This value is close to the protosolar helium mass fraction of 0.275±0.01, indicating that helium has not settled in its centre as it has in the gas giants. The third-most-abundant component of Uranus's atmosphere is methane (CH_{4}). Methane has prominent absorption bands in the visible and near-infrared (IR), making Uranus aquamarine or cyan in colour. Methane molecules account for 2.3% of the atmosphere by molar fraction below the methane cloud deck at the pressure level of 1.3 bar (130 kPa); this represents about 20 to 30 times the carbon abundance found in the Sun.

The mixing ratio (Note: Mixing ratio is defined as the number of molecules of a compound per a molecule of hydrogen.) is much lower in the upper atmosphere due to its extremely low temperature, which lowers the saturation level and causes excess methane to freeze out. The abundances of less volatile compounds such as ammonia, water, and hydrogen sulphide in the deep atmosphere are poorly known. They are probably also higher than solar values. Along with methane, trace amounts of various hydrocarbons are found in the stratosphere of Uranus, which are thought to be produced from methane by photolysis induced by the solar ultraviolet (UV) radiation. They include ethane (C_{2}H_{6}), acetylene (C_{2}H_{2}), methylacetylene (CH_{3}C_{2}H), and diacetylene (C_{2}HC_{2}H). Spectroscopy has also uncovered traces of water vapour, carbon monoxide, and carbon dioxide in the upper atmosphere, which can only originate from an external source such as infalling dust and comets.

=== Troposphere ===
The troposphere is the lowest and densest part of the atmosphere and is characterised by a decrease in temperature with altitude. The temperature falls from about 320 K (47 °C; 116 °F) at the base of the nominal troposphere at −300 km to 53 K (−220 °C; −364 °F) at 50 km. The temperatures in the coldest upper region of the troposphere (the tropopause) actually vary in the range between 49 and 57 K (−224 and −216 °C; −371 and −357 °F) depending on planetary latitude. The tropopause region is responsible for the vast majority of Uranus's thermal far infrared emissions, thus determining its effective temperature of 59.1 ± 0.3 K (−214.1 ± 0.3 °C; −353.3 ± 0.5 °F).

The troposphere is thought to have a highly complex cloud structure; water clouds are hypothesised to lie in the pressure range of 50 to 100 bar (5 to 10 MPa), ammonium hydrosulfide clouds in the range of 20 to 40 bar (2 to 4 MPa), ammonia or hydrogen sulphide clouds at between 3 and 10 bar (0.3 and 1 MPa) and finally directly detected thin methane clouds at 1 to 2 bar (0.1 to 0.2 MPa). The troposphere is a dynamic part of the atmosphere, exhibiting strong winds, bright clouds, and seasonal changes.

=== Upper atmosphere ===
A near infrared time lapse of the upper atmosphere of Uranus, taken by the James Webb Space Telescope. Blue represents the planet's lower atmosphere, while red represents higher altitudes.

The middle layer of the Uranian atmosphere is the stratosphere, where temperature generally increases with altitude from 53 K (−220 °C; −364 °F) in the tropopause to between 800 and 850 K (527 and 577 °C; 980 and 1,070 °F) at the base of the thermosphere. The heating of the stratosphere is caused by absorption of solar UV and IR radiation by methane and other hydrocarbons, which form in this part of the atmosphere as a result of methane photolysis. Heat is also conducted from the hot thermosphere. The hydrocarbons occupy a relatively narrow layer at altitudes of between 100 and 300 km corresponding to a pressure range of 1,000 to 10 Pa and temperatures of between 75 and 170 K (−198 and −103 °C; −325 and −154 °F).

The most abundant hydrocarbons are methane, acetylene, and ethane with mixing ratios of around 10^{−7} relative to hydrogen. The mixing ratio of carbon monoxide is similar at these altitudes. Heavier hydrocarbons and carbon dioxide have mixing ratios three orders of magnitude lower. The abundance ratio of water is around 7×10^{−9}. Ethane and acetylene tend to condense in the colder lower part of the stratosphere and tropopause (below 10 mBar level) forming haze layers, which may be partly responsible for the bland appearance of Uranus. The concentration of hydrocarbons in the Uranian stratosphere above the haze is significantly lower than in the stratospheres of the other giant planets.

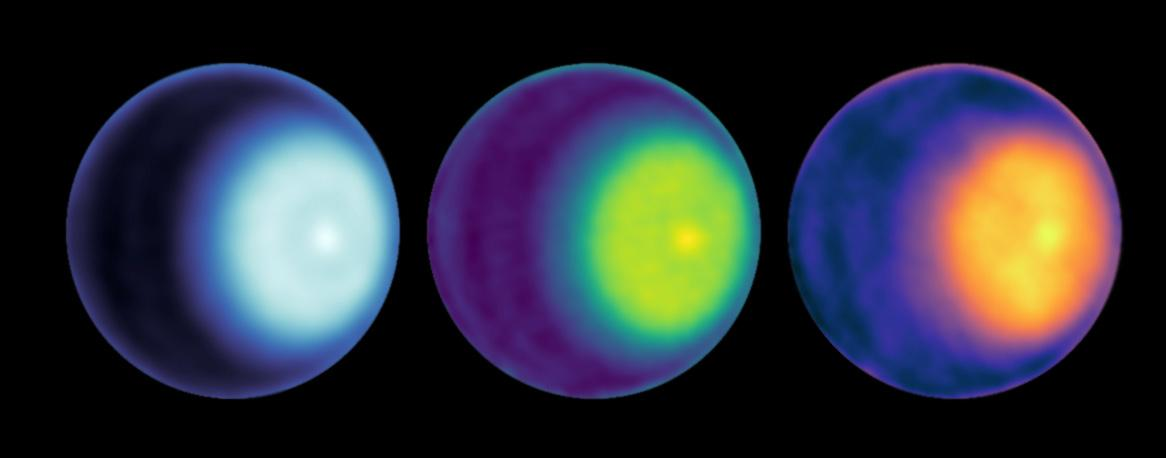
Planet Uranus – North Pole – Cyclone (VLA; October 2021)

The outermost layer of the Uranian atmosphere is the thermosphere and corona, which has a uniform temperature of around 800 K (527 °C) to 850 K (577 °C). The heat sources necessary to sustain such a high level are not understood, as neither the solar UV nor the auroral activity can provide the necessary energy to maintain these temperatures. The weak cooling efficiency due to the lack of hydrocarbons in the stratosphere above 0.1 mBar pressure levels may contribute too. In addition to molecular hydrogen, the thermosphere-corona contains many free hydrogen atoms. Their small mass and high temperatures explain why the corona extends as far as 50,000 km (31,000 mi), or two Uranian radii, from its surface.

This extended corona is a unique feature of Uranus. Its effects include a drag on small particles orbiting Uranus, causing a general depletion of dust in the Uranian rings. The Uranian thermosphere, together with the upper part of the stratosphere, corresponds to the ionosphere of Uranus. Observations show that the ionosphere occupies altitudes from 2,000 to 10,000 km (1,200 to 6,200 mi). The Uranian ionosphere is denser than that of either Saturn or Neptune, which may arise from the low concentration of hydrocarbons in the stratosphere. The ionosphere is mainly sustained by solar UV radiation and its density depends on the solar activity. Auroral activity is insignificant as compared to Jupiter and Saturn.

== Climate ==
At ultraviolet and visible wavelengths, Uranus's atmosphere is bland in comparison to the other giant planets, even to Neptune, which it otherwise closely resembles. When Voyager 2 flew by Uranus in 1986, it observed a total of 10 cloud features across the entire planet. One proposed explanation for this dearth of features is that Uranus's internal heat is markedly lower than that of the other giant planets, being the coldest planet in the Solar System.

=== Banded structure, winds and clouds ===
Voyager 2's timelapse of Uranus's dynamic atmosphere

In 1986, Voyager 2 found that the visible southern hemisphere of Uranus can be subdivided into two regions: a bright polar cap and dark equatorial bands. Their boundary is located at about −45° of latitude. A narrow band straddling the latitudinal range from −45 to −50° is the brightest large feature on its visible surface. It is called a southern "collar". The cap and collar are thought to be a dense region of methane clouds located within the pressure range of 1.3 to 2 bar. Besides the large-scale banded structure, Voyager 2 observed ten small bright clouds, most lying several degrees to the north from the collar. In all other respects, Uranus looked like a dynamically dead planet in 1986.

Voyager 2 arrived during the height of Uranus's southern summer and could not observe the northern hemisphere. At the beginning of the 21st century, when the northern polar region came into view, the Hubble Space Telescope (HST) and Keck telescope initially observed neither a collar nor a polar cap in the northern hemisphere. So Uranus appeared to be asymmetric: bright near the south pole and uniformly dark in the region north of the southern collar. In 2007, when Uranus passed its equinox, the southern collar almost disappeared, and a faint northern collar emerged near 45° of latitude. In 2023, a team employing the Very Large Array observed a dark collar at 80° latitude, and a bright spot at the north pole, indicating the presence of a polar vortex.

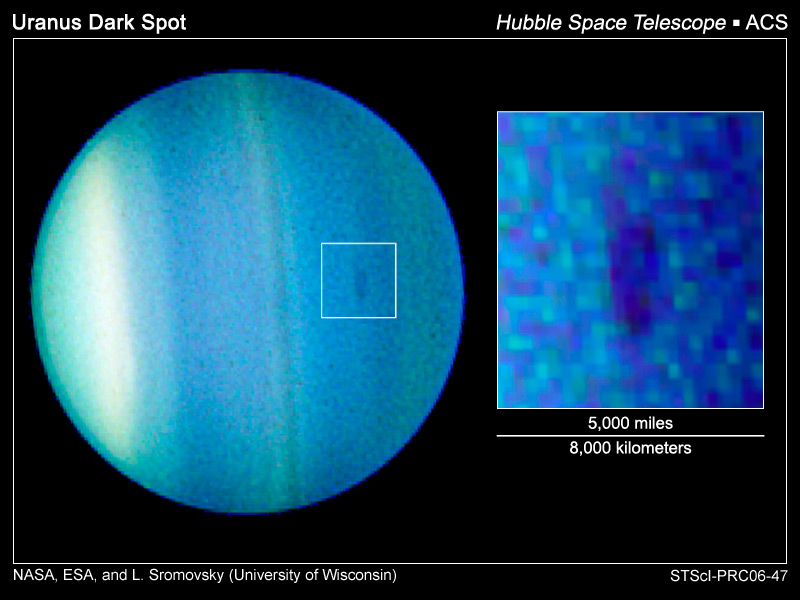
The first dark spot observed on Uranus. Image obtained by the HST ACS in 2006.

In the 1990s, the number of the observed bright cloud features grew considerably, partly because new high-resolution imaging techniques became available. Most were found in the northern hemisphere as it started to become visible. An early explanation—that bright clouds are easier to identify in its dark part, whereas in the southern hemisphere the bright collar masks them—was shown to be incorrect. Nevertheless, there are differences between the clouds of each hemisphere. The northern clouds are smaller, sharper and brighter. They appear to lie at a higher altitude. The lifetime of clouds spans several orders of magnitude. Some small clouds live for hours; at least one southern cloud may have persisted since the Voyager 2 flyby. Recent observation also discovered that cloud features on Uranus have a lot in common with those on Neptune. For example, the dark spots common on Neptune had never been observed on Uranus before 2006, when the first such feature dubbed Uranus Dark Spot was imaged. The speculation is that Uranus is becoming more Neptune-like during its equinoctial season.

The tracking of numerous cloud features allowed determination of zonal winds blowing in the upper troposphere of Uranus. At the equator winds are retrograde, which means that they blow in the reverse direction to the planetary rotation. Their speeds are from −360 to −180 km/h (−220 to −110 mph). Wind speeds increase with the distance from the equator, reaching zero values near ±20° latitude, where the troposphere's temperature minimum is located. Closer to the poles, the winds shift to a prograde direction, flowing with Uranus's rotation. Wind speeds continue to increase reaching maxima at ±60° latitude before falling to zero at the poles. Wind speeds at −40° latitude range from 540 to 720 km/h (340 to 450 mph). Because the collar obscures all clouds below that parallel, speeds between it and the southern pole are impossible to measure. In contrast, in the northern hemisphere maximum speeds as high as 860 km/h (540 mph) are observed near +50° latitude.

In 1986, the Voyager 2 Planetary Radio Astronomy (PRA) experiment observed 140 lightning flashes, or Uranian electrostatic discharges with a frequency of 0.9-40 MHz. The UEDs were detected from 600,000 km of Uranus over 24 hours, most of which were not visible. However, microphysical modelling suggests that Uranian lightning occurs in convective storms occurring in deep troposphere water clouds. If this is the case, lightning will not be visible due to the thick cloud layers above the troposphere. Uranian lightning has a power of around 10^{8} W, emits 1×10^7 J - 2×10^7 J of energy, and lasts an average of 120 ms. There is a possibility that the power of Uranian lightning varies greatly with the seasons caused by changes in convection rates in the clouds Uranian lightning is much more powerful than lightning on Earth and comparable to Jovian lightning. During the ice giant flybys, "Voyager 2" detected lightning more clearly on Uranus than on Neptune due to the planet's lower gravity and possible warmer deep atmosphere.

=== Seasonal variation ===
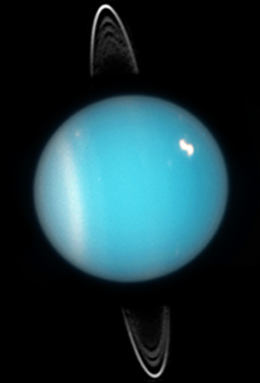
Uranus in 2005. Rings, southern collar and a bright cloud in the northern hemisphere are visible (HST ACS image).

For a short period from March to May 2004, large clouds appeared in the Uranian atmosphere, giving it a Neptune-like appearance. Observations included record-breaking wind speeds of 820 km/h (510 mph) and a persistent thunderstorm referred to as "Fourth of July fireworks". On 23 August 2006, researchers at the Space Science Institute (Boulder, Colorado) and the University of Wisconsin observed a dark spot on Uranus's surface, giving scientists more insight into Uranus atmospheric activity. Why this sudden upsurge in activity occurred is not fully known, but it appears that Uranus's extreme axial tilt results in extreme seasonal variations in its weather. Determining the nature of this seasonal variation is difficult because good data on Uranus's atmosphere has existed for less than 84 years, or one full Uranian year. Photometry over the course of half a Uranian year (beginning in the 1950s) has shown regular variation in the brightness in two spectral bands, with maxima occurring at the solstices and minima occurring at the equinoxes. A similar periodic variation, with maxima at the solstices, has been noted in microwave measurements of the deep troposphere begun in the 1960s. Stratospheric temperature measurements beginning in the 1970s also showed maximum values near the 1986 solstice. The majority of this variability is thought to occur owing to changes in viewing geometry.

There are some indications that physical seasonal changes are happening in Uranus. Although Uranus is known to have a bright south polar region, the north pole is fairly dim, which is incompatible with the model of the seasonal change outlined above. During its previous northern solstice in 1944, Uranus displayed elevated levels of brightness, which suggests that the north pole was not always so dim. This information implies that the visible pole brightens some time before the solstice and darkens after the equinox. Detailed analysis of the visible and microwave data revealed that the periodical changes in brightness are not completely symmetrical around the solstices, which also indicates a change in the meridional albedo patterns.

In the 1990s, as Uranus moved away from its solstice, Hubble and ground-based telescopes revealed that the south polar cap darkened noticeably (except the southern collar, which remained bright), whereas the northern hemisphere demonstrated increasing activity, such as cloud formations and stronger winds, bolstering expectations that it should brighten soon. This indeed happened in 2007 when it passed an equinox: a faint northern polar collar arose, and the southern collar became nearly invisible, although the zonal wind profile remained slightly asymmetric, with northern winds being somewhat slower than southern.

The mechanism of these physical changes is still not clear. Near the summer and winter solstices, Uranus's hemispheres lie alternately either in full glare of the Sun's rays or facing deep space. The brightening of the sunlit hemisphere is thought to result from the local thickening of the methane clouds and haze layers located in the troposphere. The bright collar at −45° latitude is also connected with methane clouds. Other changes in the southern polar region can be explained by changes in the lower cloud layers. The variation of the microwave emission from Uranus is probably caused by changes in the deep tropospheric circulation, because thick polar clouds and haze may inhibit convection. Now that the spring and autumn equinoxes are arriving on Uranus, the dynamics are changing and convection can occur again.

== Magnetosphere ==
The magnetic field of Uranus (animated; 25 March 2020)

Before the arrival of Voyager 2, no measurements of the Uranian magnetosphere had been taken, so its nature remained a mystery. Before 1986, scientists had expected the magnetic field of Uranus to be in line with the solar wind, because it would then align with Uranus's poles that lie in the ecliptic.

Voyager's observations revealed that Uranus's magnetic field is peculiar, both because it does not originate from its geometric centre, and because it is tilted at 59° from the axis of rotation. In fact, the magnetic dipole is shifted from Uranus's centre towards the south rotational pole by as much as one-third of the planetary radius. This unusual geometry results in a highly asymmetric magnetosphere, where the magnetic field strength on the surface in the southern hemisphere can be as low as 0.1 gauss (10 μT), whereas in the northern hemisphere it can be as high as 1.1 gauss (110 μT). The average field at the surface is 0.23 gauss (23 μT).

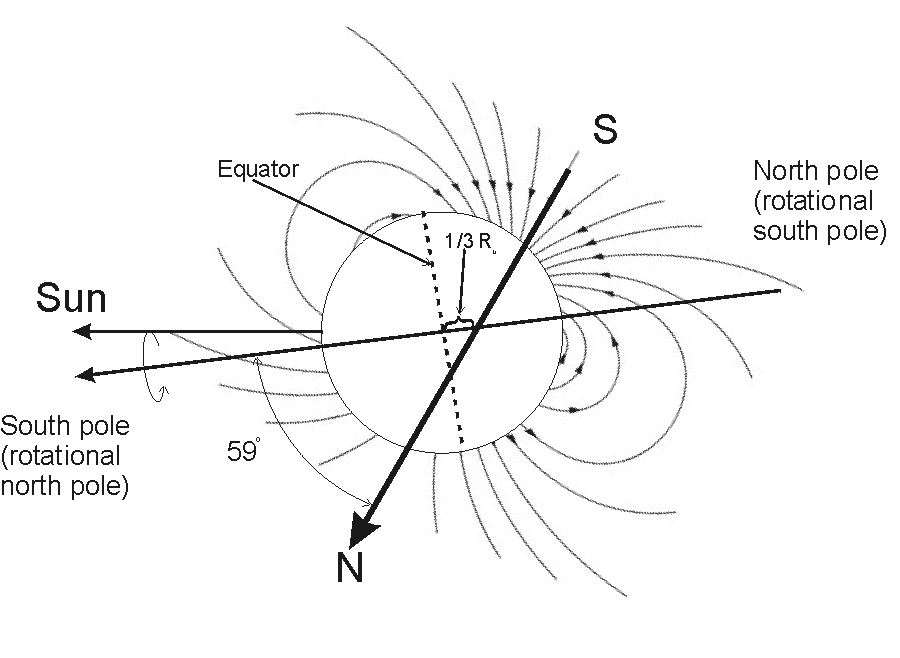
A diagram showing Uranus's asymmetric magnetosphere

Studies of Voyager 2 data in 2017 suggest that this asymmetry causes Uranus's magnetosphere to connect with the solar wind once a Uranian day, opening the planet to the Sun's particles. In comparison, the magnetic field of Earth is roughly as strong at either pole, and its "magnetic equator" is roughly parallel with its geographical equator. The dipole moment of Uranus is 50 times that of Earth. Neptune has a similarly displaced and tilted magnetic field, suggesting that this may be a common feature of ice giants. One hypothesis is that, unlike the magnetic fields of the terrestrial and gas giants, which are generated within their cores, the ice giants' magnetic fields are generated by motion at relatively shallow depths, for instance, in the water–ammonia ocean. Another possible explanation for the magnetosphere's alignment is that there are oceans of liquid diamond in Uranus's interior that would deter the magnetic field.

It is, however, unclear whether the observed asymmetry of Uranus's magnetic field represents the typical state of the magnetosphere, or a coincidence of observing it during unusual space weather conditions. A post-analysis of Voyager data from 2024 suggests that the strongly asymmetric shape of the magnetosphere observed during the fly-by represents an anomalous state, as the measured values of solar wind density at the time were unusually high, which could have compressed Uranus's magnetosphere. The interaction with the solar wind event could also explain the apparent paradox of presence of strong electron radiation belts despite the otherwise low magnetospheric plasma density measured. Such conditions are estimated to occur less than 5% of the time.

Despite its curious alignment, in other respects the Uranian magnetosphere is like those of other planets: it has a bow shock at about 23 Uranian radii ahead of it, a magnetopause at 18 Uranian radii, a fully developed magnetotail, and radiation belts. Overall, the structure of Uranus's magnetosphere is different from Jupiter's and more similar to Saturn's. Uranus's magnetotail trails behind it into space for millions of kilometres and is twisted by its sideways rotation into a long corkscrew.

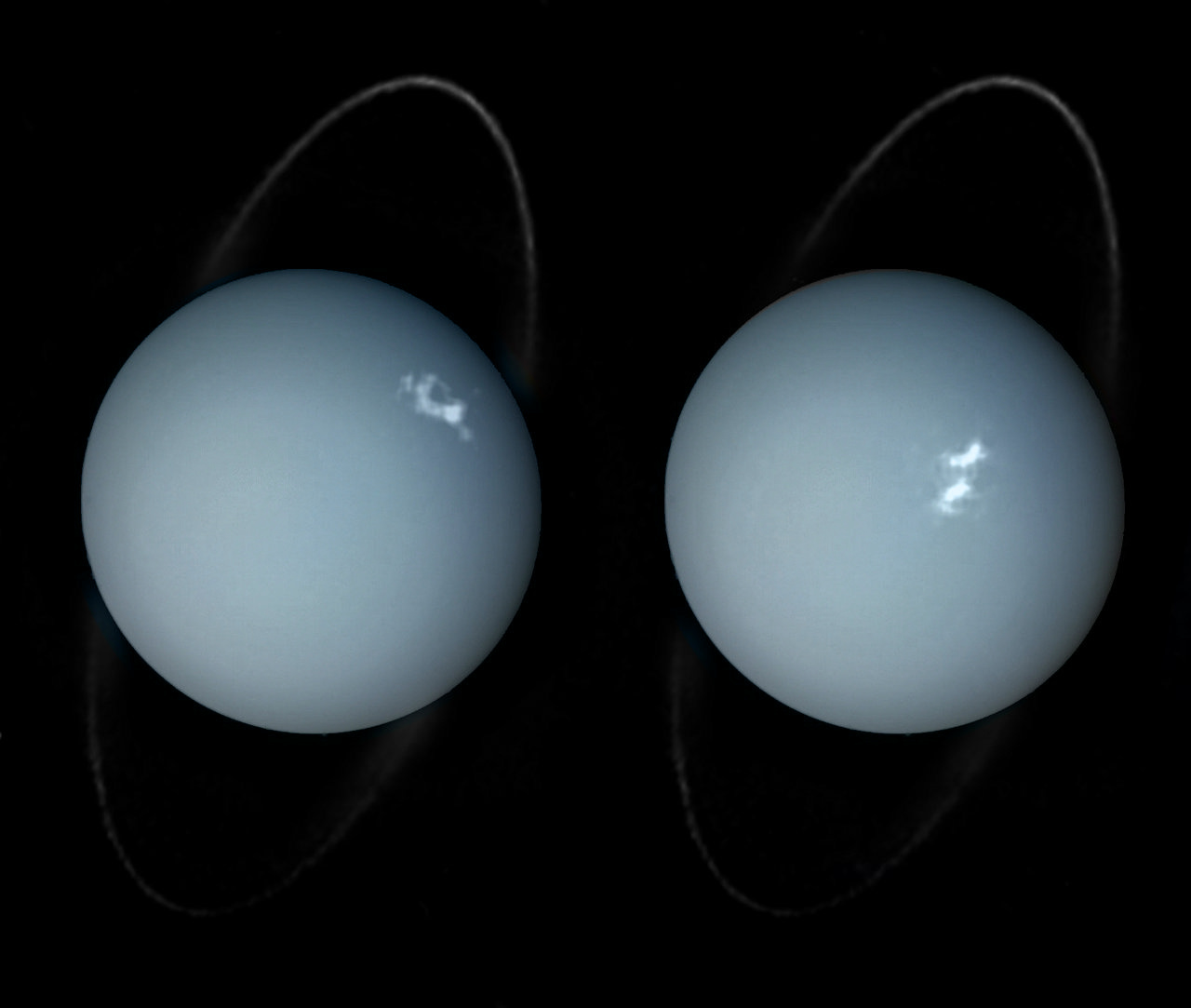
Aurorae on Uranus taken by the Space Telescope Imaging Spectrograph (STIS) installed on Hubble.

Uranus's magnetosphere contains charged particles: mainly protons and electrons, with a small amount of H_{2}^{+} ions. Many of these particles probably derive from the thermosphere. The ion and electron energies can be as high as 4 and 1.2 megaelectronvolts, respectively. The density of low-energy (below 1 kiloelectronvolt) ions in the inner magnetosphere is about 2 cm^{−3}. The particle population is strongly affected by the Uranian moons, which sweep through the magnetosphere, leaving noticeable gaps. The particle flux is high enough to cause darkening or space weathering of their surfaces on an astronomically rapid timescale of 100,000 years. This may be the cause of the uniformly dark colouration of the Uranian satellites and rings.

Uranus has relatively well developed aurorae, which are seen as bright arcs around both magnetic poles. Unlike Jupiter's, Uranus's aurorae seem to be insignificant for the energy balance of the planetary thermosphere. They, or rather their trihydrogen cations' infrared spectral emissions, have been studied in-depth as of late 2023.

In March 2020, NASA astronomers reported the detection of a large atmospheric magnetic bubble, also known as a plasmoid, released into outer space from the planet Uranus, after reevaluating old data recorded by the Voyager 2 space probe during a flyby of the planet in 1986.

== Moons ==
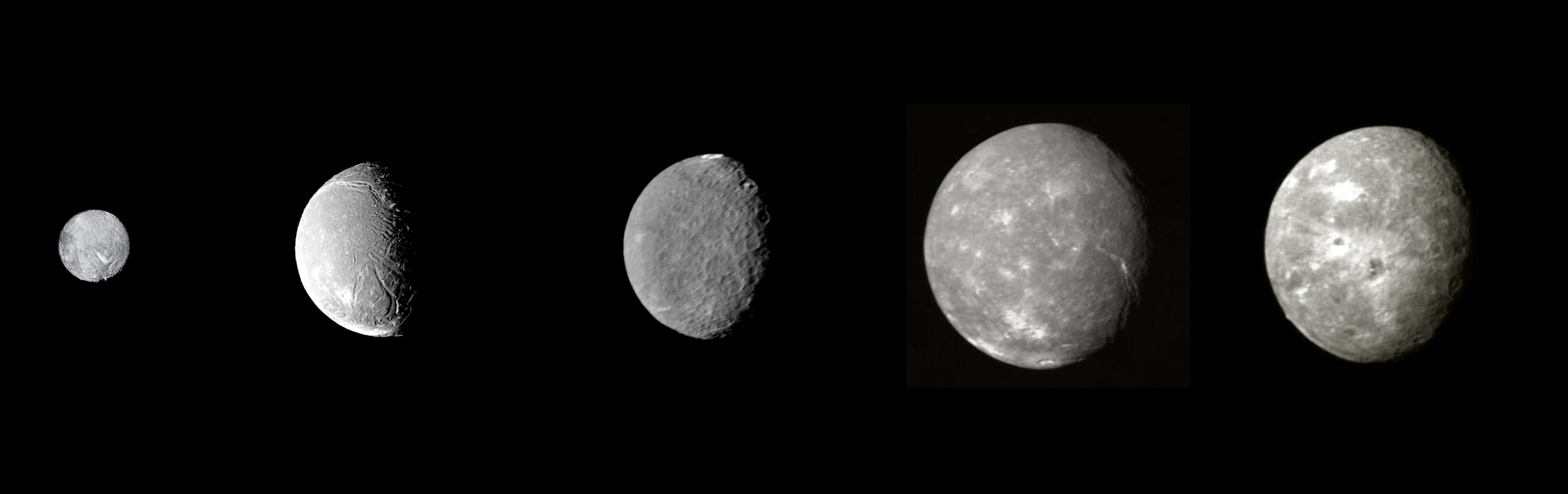
Major moons of Uranus in order of increasing distance (left to right), at their proper relative sizes and albedos. From left to right, they are Miranda, Ariel, Umbriel, Titania, and Oberon. (collage of Voyager 2 photographs)

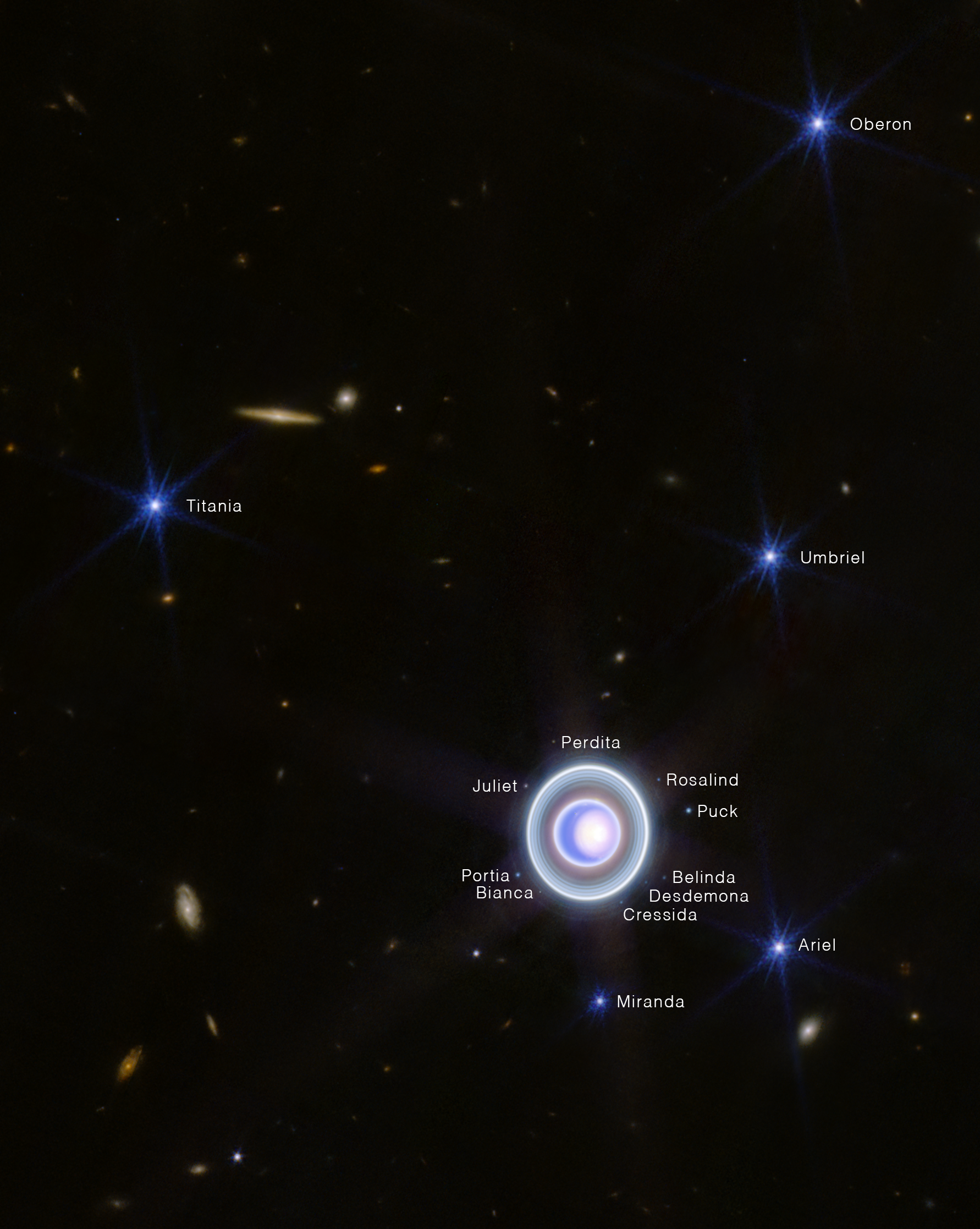
Uranus along with its five major moons and nine inner moons as taken by the James Webb Space Telescope's NIRCam.

Uranus has 29 known natural satellites. The names of these satellites are chosen from characters in the works of William Shakespeare and Alexander Pope. The five main satellites are Miranda, Ariel, Umbriel, Titania, and Oberon. The Uranian satellite system is the least massive among those of the giant planets; the combined mass of the five major satellites would be less than half that of Triton (largest moon of Neptune) alone. The largest of Uranus's satellites, Titania, has a radius of only 788.9 km (490.2 mi), or less than half that of the Moon, but slightly more than Rhea, the second-largest satellite of Saturn, making Titania the eighth-largest moon in the Solar System. Uranus's satellites have relatively low albedos; ranging from 0.20 for Umbriel to 0.35 for Ariel (in green light). They are ice–rock conglomerates composed of roughly 50% ice and 50% rock. The ice may include ammonia and carbon dioxide.

Among the Uranian satellites, Ariel appears to have the youngest surface, with the fewest impact craters, and Umbriel the oldest. Miranda has fault canyons 20 km (12 mi) deep, terraced layers, and a chaotic variation in surface ages and features. Miranda's past geologic activity is thought to have been driven by tidal heating at a time when its orbit was more eccentric than currently, probably as a result of a former 3:1 orbital resonance with Umbriel. Extensional processes associated with upwelling diapirs are the likely origin of Miranda's 'racetrack'-like coronae. Ariel is thought to have once been held in a 4:1 resonance with Titania.

Uranus has at least one horseshoe orbiter occupying the Sun–Uranus L_{3} Lagrangian point—a gravitationally unstable region at 180° in its orbit, 83982 Crantor. Crantor moves inside Uranus's co-orbital region on a complex, temporary horseshoe orbit. 2010 EU65 is also a promising Uranus horseshoe librator candidate.

== Rings ==
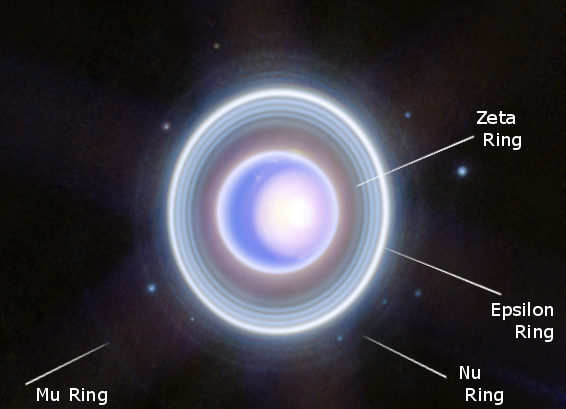
Uranus's rings, inner moons, and atmosphere as imaged by the James Webb Space Telescope's near-infrared camera

The Uranian rings are composed of extremely dark particles, which vary in size from micrometres to a fraction of a metre. Thirteen distinct rings are presently known, the brightest being the ε ring. All except the two rings of Uranus are extremely narrow—they are usually a few kilometres wide. The rings are probably quite young; the dynamics considerations indicate that they did not form with Uranus. The matter in the rings may once have been part of a moon (or moons) that was shattered by high-speed impacts. From numerous pieces of debris that formed as a result of those impacts, only a few particles survived, in stable zones corresponding to the locations of the present rings.

William Herschel described a possible ring around Uranus in 1789. This sighting is generally considered doubtful, because the rings are quite faint, and in the two following centuries none were noted by other observers. Still, Herschel made an accurate description of the epsilon ring's size, its angle relative to Earth, its red colour, and its apparent changes as Uranus travelled around the Sun. The ring system was definitively discovered on 10 March 1977 by James L. Elliot, Edward W. Dunham, and Jessica Mink using the Kuiper Airborne Observatory. The discovery was serendipitous; they planned to use the occultation of the star SAO 158687 (also known as HD 128598) by Uranus to study its atmosphere. When their observations were analysed, they found that the star had disappeared briefly from view five times both before and after it disappeared behind Uranus. They concluded that there must be a ring system around Uranus. Later, they detected four additional rings. The rings were directly imaged when Voyager 2 passed Uranus in 1986. Voyager 2 also discovered two additional faint rings, bringing the total number to eleven.

In December 2005, the Hubble Space Telescope detected a pair of previously unknown rings. The largest is located twice as far from Uranus as the previously known rings. These new rings are so far from Uranus that they are called the "outer" ring system. Hubble also spotted two small satellites, one of which, Mab, shares its orbit with the outermost newly discovered ring. The new rings bring the total number of Uranian rings to 13. In April 2006, images of the new rings from the Keck Observatory yielded the colours of the outer rings: the outermost is blue and the other one red. One hypothesis concerning the outer ring's blue colour is that it is composed of minute particles of water ice from the surface of Mab that are small enough to scatter blue light. In contrast, Uranus's inner rings appear grey.

Although the Uranian rings are very difficult to directly observe from Earth, advances in digital imaging have allowed several amateur astronomers to successfully photograph the rings with red or infrared filters; telescopes with apertures as small as 36 cm (14 inches) may be able to detect the rings with proper imaging equipment.

== Exploration ==
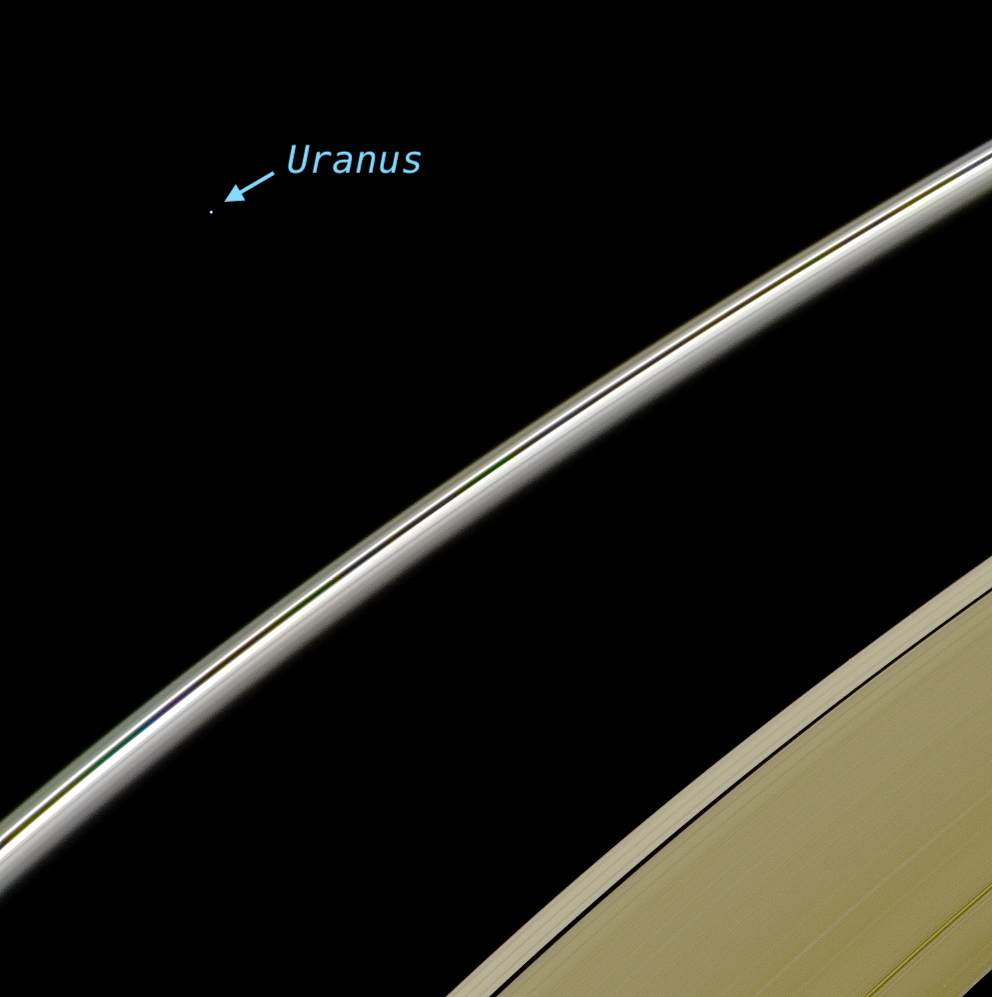
Uranus as seen from the Cassini spacecraft at Saturn

Launched in 1977, Voyager 2 made its closest approach to Uranus on 24 January 1986, coming within 81,500 km (50,600 mi) of the cloudtops, before continuing its journey to Neptune. The spacecraft studied the structure and chemical composition of Uranus's atmosphere, including its unique weather, caused by its extreme axial tilt. It made the first detailed investigations of its five largest moons and discovered 10 new ones. Voyager 2 examined all nine of the system's known rings and discovered two more. It also studied the magnetic field, its irregular structure, its tilt and its unique corkscrew magnetotail caused by Uranus's sideways orientation.

No other spacecraft has flown by Uranus since then, though there have been many proposed missions to revisit the Uranus system. The possibility of sending the Cassini spacecraft from Saturn to Uranus was evaluated during a mission extension planning phase in 2009, but was ultimately rejected in favour of destroying it in the Saturnian atmosphere, as it would have taken about twenty years to get to the Uranian system after departing Saturn. A Uranus entry probe could use Pioneer Venus Multiprobe heritage and descend to 1–5 atmospheres. The Uranus Orbiter and Probe was recommended by the 2013–2022 Planetary Science Decadal Survey published in 2011; the proposal envisaged launch during 2020–2023 and a 13-year cruise to Uranus. The committee's opinion was reaffirmed in 2022, when a Uranus probe/orbiter mission was placed at the highest priority, due to the lack of knowledge about ice giants. Most recently, the CNSA's Tianwen-4 Jupiter orbiter, launching in 2029, is planned to have a subprobe that will detach and get a gravity assist instead of entering orbit, flying by Uranus in March 2045 before heading to interstellar space. China also has plans for a potential Tianwen-5 that may orbit either Uranus or Neptune that have yet to come to fruition.

== In culture ==
As well as being a popular subject in fiction, Uranus has inspired artistic works including Lydia Sigourney's 1827 poem The Georgian Planet and a movement in Gustav Holst's orchestral suite The Planets, written between 1914 and 1916. Herschel's discovery of the planet is also referenced in the lines "Then felt I like some watcher of the skies/When a new planet swims into his ken", from John Keats's poem "On First Looking into Chapman's Homer". The planet's discovery also inspired the naming of the chemical element uranium, itself discovered in 1789 by the German chemist Martin Heinrich Klaproth.

In modern astrology, the planet Uranus (symbol) is the ruling planet of Aquarius; prior to the discovery of Uranus, the ruling planet of Aquarius was Saturn. Because Uranus is cyan and Uranus is associated with electricity, the colour electric blue, which is close to cyan, is associated with the sign Aquarius.

== See also ==
- 2011 QF99 and 2014 YX49, the only two known Uranus trojans
- Colonisation of Uranus
- Extraterrestrial diamonds (thought to be abundant in Uranus)
- Outline of Uranus
- Statistics of planets in the Solar System
- Uranus in astrology
- Uranus in fiction
