= 2010 EU65 =

Centaur

2010 EU_{65}
Discovery
- Discovered by: D. Rabinowitz; S. Tourtellotte
- Discovery site: La Silla Obs.
- Discovery date: 13 March 2010 (First observed only)

Designations
- Minor planet category: centaur

Orbital characteristics
- Epoch 21 November 2025 (JD 2461000.5)
- Uncertainty parameter 3 · 2
- Observation arc: 10.12 yr (3,698 d)
- Aphelion: 22.691 AU
- Perihelion: 16.997 AU
- Semi-major axis: 19.844 AU
- Eccentricity: 0.1434
- Orbital period (sidereal): 88.40 yr (32,288 d)
- Mean anomaly: 18.861°
- Mean motion: 0° 0^{m} 40.14^{s} / day
- Inclination: 14.568°
- Longitude of ascending node: 4.5781°
- Time of perihelion: 21 June 2021 (Note: JPL Horizons Observer Location: @sun (Perihelion occurs when deldot changes from negative to positive.))
- Argument of perihelion: 239.08°
- T_{Jupiter}: 4.003

Physical characteristics
- Mean diameter: 64 km (est. at 0.09)
- Apparent magnitude: 21.74
- Absolute magnitude (H): 9.1

2010 EU_{65} is a centaur, approximately 64 kilometers (40 miles) in diameter, orbiting the Sun in the outer Solar System. The object is also a promising Uranus horseshoe librator candidate. It was first observed on 13 March 2010, by American astronomers David Rabinowitz and Suzanne Tourtellotte, observing from Cerro Tololo and La Silla Observatory in Chile. As of 2026, it has neither been numbered nor named.

== Orbit and classification ==
2010 EU_{65} is classified as a centaur, a group of non-resonant small Solar System bodies whose orbit around the Sun lie typically between the orbits of Jupiter and Neptune (5 to 30 AU). Centaurs are minor planets with characteristics of comets, and often classified as such. The dynamical group is formed due to Neptune's eroding effect on the Kuiper belt by means of gravitational scattering, sending objects inward to become centaurs, or outward to become scattered-disc objects, or removing them from the Solar System entirely. Centaurs themselves have unstable orbits with short lifetimes, transitioning from the inactive population of Kuiper belt objects to the active group of Jupiter-family comets within approximately one million years.

It orbits the Sun at a distance of 17.0–22.7 AU once every 88 years and 5 months (32,288 days; semi-major axis of 19.84 AU). Its orbit has an eccentricity of 0.14 and an inclination of 15° with respect to the ecliptic. It has a Tisserand's parameter with respect to Jupiter (T_{J}) of 4.003, above the threshold of 3, typically used to distinguish asteroids from Jupiter-family comets. On 21 June 2021, the object came to perihelion at 17.0 AU and has since been moving away from the Sun. As of 2026 the object is at 17.215 AU, with an apparent magnitude of 21.74. The body's observation arc begins with a precovery observation taken by the Mount Lemmon Survey in April 2009.

=== Uranus horseshoe candidate ===
Based on its current heliocentric orbit, 2010 EU_{65} follows a horseshoe orbit around Uranus' L_{3} point. Giving the fact that its orbit is, at present, poorly determined, the object is a promising Uranus horseshoe orbiter candidate.

== Physical properties ==
2010 EU_{65} has an absolute magnitude of 9.1. Based on a generic magnitude-to-diameter conversion, it measures approximately 64 kilometers (40 miles) in diameter assuming an albedo of 0.09.

== See also ==
- List of centaurs (small Solar System bodies) § 2010 EU65
