= F. M. Devienne =

French physicist

Fernand Marcel Devienne (20 February 1913 – 19 April 2003) was a French physicist who developed research on molecular beams and spectrum analysis in rarefied gas environment.

== Life ==
Devienne was born in Marseille on 20 February 1913.

A Doctor of physics, F. Marcel Devienne was director of a research laboratory (Laboratoire de Physique Moléculaire des Hautes Énergies de Peymeinade, now closed) in Peymeinade, Alpes-Maritimes. He also presided yearly symposiums on molecular beams. Devienne was one of the first to study the energy properties of triatomic hydrogen molecules and triatomic deuterium. His researches also sought to recreate interstellar-like conditions to experiment synthesis of biological compounds in such environments. Devienne also conducted extensive fast atom bombardment experiments in mass spectrometry.

Devienne died on 19 April 2003 in Cannes.

== Honours ==
F. M. Devienne was chevalier of the Legion of Honour, member of the New York Academy of Sciences, Fellow of the International Symposiulm on Molecular Beams, laureate of the 1997 Lazare-Carnot Prize and of the 1972 Gustave Ribaud Prize of the French Academy of Sciences.

== Works ==
- F. M. Devienne (ed.) Rarefied Gas Dynamics, Pergamon Press, 1960
- F. M. Devienne Jets Moléculaires de Hautes Énergies, 1961 (in French)

== Resources ==
- F. M. Devienne facts on WorldCat
- F-Marcel Devienne facts on SciTech
