= Molecular beam =

Focused high-velocity stream of atoms or molecules

A molecular beam is produced by allowing a gas at higher pressure to expand through a small orifice into a chamber at lower pressure to form a beam of particles (atoms, free radicals, molecules or ions) moving at approximately equal velocities, with very few collisions between the particles. Molecular beams are useful for fabricating thin films in molecular beam epitaxy and artificial structures such as quantum wells, quantum wires, and quantum dots. Molecular beams have also been applied as crossed molecular beams. The molecules in the molecular beam can be manipulated by electrical fields and magnetic fields. Molecules can be decelerated in a Stark decelerator or in a Zeeman slower.

== History ==
The first to experiment with atomic beams was Louis Dunoyer de Segonzac in 1911, but his were simple verification experiments to confirm whether atoms travelled in straight lines when not acted upon by external forces.

In 1921, Hartmut Kallmann and Fritz Reiche wrote about the deflection of beams of polar molecules in an inhomogeneous electric field, with the ultimate aim of measuring their dipole moments. Seeing the page proofs for the Kallman and Reiche work prompted Otto Stern at the University of Hamburg and University of Frankfurt am Main to rush publication of his work with Walther Gerlach on what later became known as the Stern–Gerlach experiment. (Stern's paper references the preprint, but the Kallman and Reiche work would go largely unnoticed.)

When the 1922 Stern-Gerlach paper appeared, it caused a sensation: they claimed to have experimentally demonstrated "space quantization": clear evidence of quantum effects at a time when classical models were still considered viable. The initial quantum explanation of the measurement — as an observation of orbital angular momentum — was not correct. Five years of intense work on quantum theory was needed before it was realized that the experiment was in fact the first demonstration of electron spin. Stern's group would go on to create pioneering experiments with atomic beams, and later with molecular beams. The advances of Stern and collaborators led to decisive discoveries including: the discovery of space quantization; de Broglie matter waves; anomalous magnetic moments of the proton and neutron; recoil of an atom by emission of a photon; and the limitation of scattering cross-sections for molecular collisions imposed by the uncertainty principle.

The first to report on the relationship between dipole moments and deflection in a molecular beam (using binary salts such as KCl) was Erwin Wrede in 1927.

In 1939, Isidor Rabi invented a molecular beam magnetic resonance method in which two magnets, placed one after the other, create an inhomogeneous magnetic field. It was used to measure the magnetic moment of several lithium isotopes, by employing beams of LiCl, LiF and dilithium. This method can be considered a predecessor to current methods in NMR spectroscopy. The invention of the maser in 1957 by James P. Gordon, Herbert J. Zeiger and Charles H. Townes was made possible by a molecular beam of ammonia and a special electrostatic quadrupole focuser.

The study of molecular beams led to the development of molecular-beam epitaxy in the 1960s.

== See also ==
- Norman Ramsey
- John B. Fenn
- F.M. Devienne
- Dudley R. Herschbach
