= Hydrogen ion cluster =

A hydrogen molecular ion cluster or hydrogen cluster ion is a positively charged cluster of hydrogen molecules. The hydrogen molecular ion (H^{+}_{2}) and trihydrogen ion (H^{+}_{3}) are well defined molecular species. However hydrogen also forms singly charged clusters (H^{+}_{n}) with n up to 120.

== Experiments ==
Hydrogen ion clusters can be formed in liquid helium or with lesser cluster size in pure hydrogen. H^{+}_{6} is far more common than higher even numbered clusters. H^{+}_{6} is stable in solid hydrogen. The positive charge is balanced by a solvated electron. It is formed when ionizing radiation impinges on solid hydrogen, and so is formed in radioactive solid tritium. In natural hydrogen treated with radiation, the positive charge transfers to HD molecules, in preference to H_{2}, with the ultimate most stable arrangement being HD(HD)^{+}HD. H^{+}_{6} can migrate through solid hydrogen by linking a hydrogen molecule at one end and losing it at the other: H_{2} + H^{+}_{6} → H^{+}_{6} + H_{2}. This migration stops once an HD molecule is added resulting in a lower energy level. HD or D_{2} is added in preference over H_{2}.

Clampitt and Gowland found clusters with an odd number of hydrogen atoms H^{+}_{3+2n} and later showed that H^{+}_{15} was relatively stable. H^{+}_{3} formed the core of this cluster with six H_{2} molecules surrounding it. Hiroka studied the stability of the odd numbered clusters in gas up to H^{+}_{21}. Bae determined that H^{+}_{15} was especially stable amongst the odd numbered clusters.

Kirchner discovered even numbered atomic clusters in gas at lower concentrations than the odd numbered atom clusters. H^{+}_{6} was twenty times less abundant than H^{+}_{5}. H^{+}_{4}, H^{+}_{8} and H^{+}_{10} were detected at lesser amounts than H^{+}_{6}. Kurosaki and Takayanagi showed that H^{+}_{6} is much more stable than other even clusters and showed antiprismatic symmetry of order 4 (D_{2d} molecular symmetry). This turnstile structured molecule was computationally found to be more energetically stable than a ring of five hydrogen atoms around a proton.

Negative hydrogen clusters have not been found to exist. H^{−}_{3} is theoretically unstable, but D^{−}_{3} in theory is bound at 0.003 eV.

== Decay ==
H^{+}_{6} in the free gas state decays by giving off H atoms and H_{2} molecules. Different energies of decay occur with levels averaging at 0.038 eV and peaking at 0.14 eV.

== Formation ==
Hydrogen molecular ion clusters can be formed through different kinds of ionizing radiation. High energy electrons capable of ionizing the material can perform this task. When hydrogen dissolved in liquid helium is irradiated with electrons their energy must be sufficient to ionize helium to produce significant hydrogen clusters. Irradiation of solid hydrogen by gamma rays or X-rays also produces H^{+}_{6}.

Positive ion clusters are also formed when compressed hydrogen expands though a nozzle.

Kirchner's theory for the formation of even numbered clusters was that neutral H_{3} molecules reacted with the H^{+}_{3} ion (or other odd clusters) to make H^{+}_{6}.

== Properties ==
Solvation of H^{+}_{6} in solid hydrogen had little effect on its spectrum.

== Use ==
SRI International studied solid ionic hydrogen fuel. They believed that a solid containing H^{+}_{3} and H^{−} ions could be manufactured. If it could be made it would have a higher energy than other rocket fuels with only 2% concentration of ions. However they could not contain the H^{−} in a stable way, but determined that other negative ions would do as well. This theoretical impulse exceeds that of solid and liquid fuel rockets. SRI developed a cluster ion gun that could make positive and negative ion clusters at a current of 500 pA.

Nuclear fusion using ion clusters can impact far more atoms than single ions in one hit. This concept is called cluster ion fusion (CIF). Lithium deuteride (LiD) is a potential starter material for generating the ions.
