= Trihydrogen cation =

Polyatomic ion (H3, charge +1)

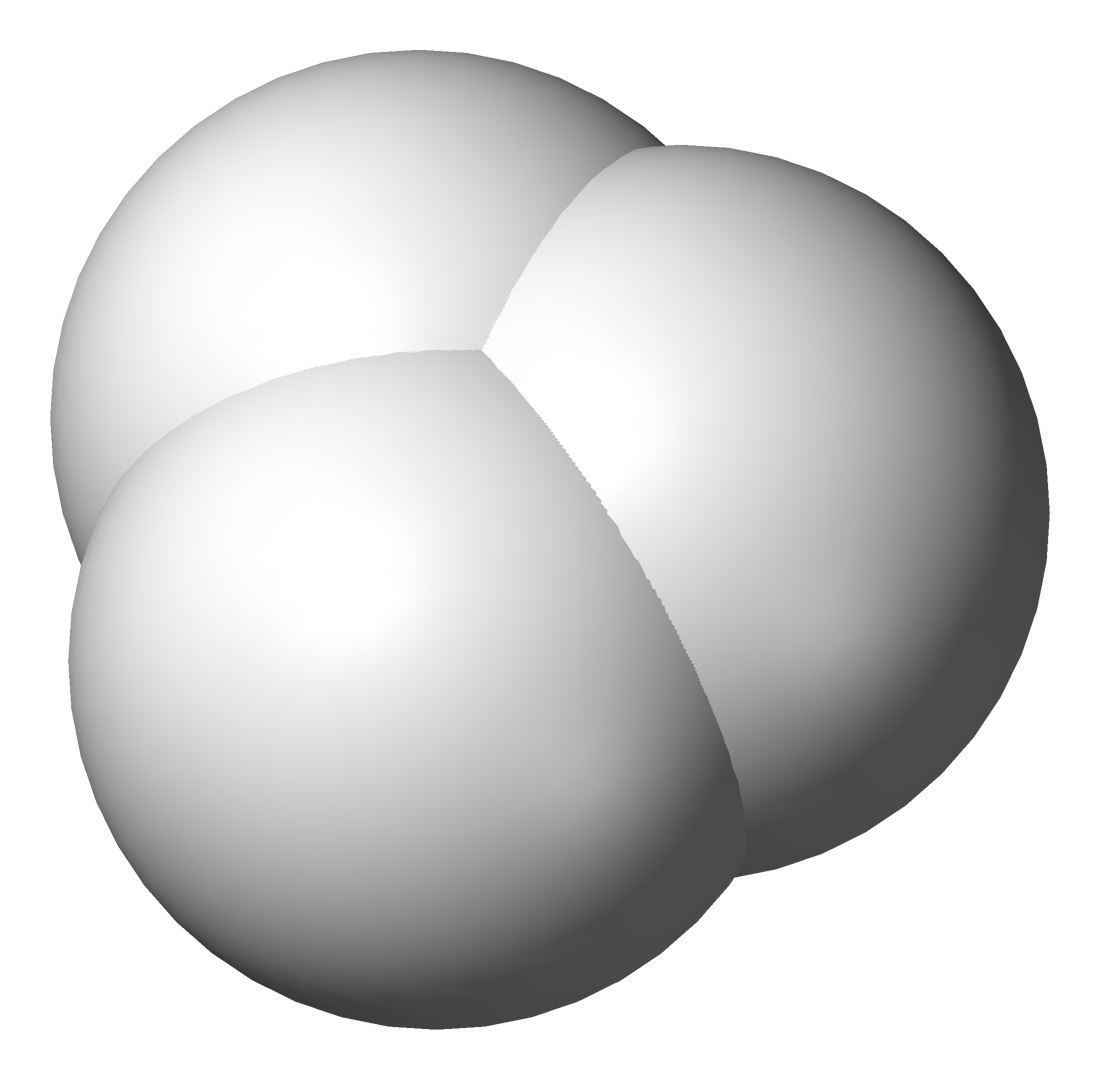

Names
- IUPAC name Hydrogenonium

Identifiers
CAS Number	28132-48-1
3D model (JSmol)	Interactive image
ChEBI	CHEBI:30479
ChemSpider	21865043
Gmelin Reference	249
CompTox Dashboard (EPA)	DTXSID801315416
- InChI: InChI=1S/H3/c1-2-3-1/q+1 Key: RQZCXKHVAUFVMF-UHFFFAOYSA-N
- SMILES: [H+]1[H][H]1

Properties
Chemical formula	H^{+}_{3}
Molar mass	3.024 g·mol^{−1}
Conjugate base	Dihydrogen, H_{2}

Related compounds
Other anions	Hydride
Other cations	Hydrogen ion; Dihydrogen cation; Hydrogen ion cluster
Related compounds	Trihydrogen
- Except where otherwise noted, data are given for materials in their standard state (at 25 °C [77 °F], 100 kPa). Infobox references

The trihydrogen cation or protonated molecular hydrogen (IUPAC name: hydrogenonium ion) is a cation (positive ion) with formula H^{+}_{3}, consisting of three hydrogen nuclei (protons) sharing two electrons.

The trihydrogen cation is one of the most abundant ions in the universe. It is stable in the interstellar medium (ISM) due to the low temperature and low density of interstellar space. The role that H^{+}_{3} plays in the gas-phase chemistry of the ISM is unparalleled by any other polyatomic ion.

The trihydrogen cation is the simplest triatomic molecule, because its two electrons are the only valence electrons in the system. It is also the simplest example of a three-center two-electron bond system.

== History ==
H^{+}_{3} was first discovered by J. J. Thomson in 1911. While using an early form of mass spectrometry to study the resultant species of plasma discharges, he discovered a large abundance of a polyatomic ion with a mass-to-charge ratio of 3. He stated that the only two possibilities were C^{4+} or H^{+}_{3}. Since the signal grew stronger in pure hydrogen gas, he correctly assigned the species as H^{+}_{3}.

The formation pathway was discovered by Hogness & Lunn in 1925. They also used an early form of mass spectrometry to study hydrogen discharges. They found that as the pressure of hydrogen increased, the amount of H^{+}_{3} increased linearly and the amount of H^{+}_{2} decreased linearly. In addition, there was little H^{+} at any pressure. These data suggested the proton exchange formation pathway discussed below.

In 1961, Martin et al. first suggested that H^{+}_{3} may be present in interstellar space given the large amount of hydrogen in interstellar space and its reaction pathway was exothermic (~1.5 eV). This led to the suggestion of Watson and Herbst & Klemperer in 1973 that H^{+}_{3} is responsible for the formation of many observed molecular ions.

It was not until 1980 that the first spectrum of H^{+}_{3} was discovered by Takeshi Oka, which was of the ν_{2} fundamental band (see #Spectroscopy) using a technique called frequency modulation detection. This started the search for extraterrestrial H^{+}_{3}. Emission lines were detected in the late 1980s and early 1990s in the ionospheres of Jupiter, Saturn, and Uranus. In the textbook by Bunker and Jensen Figure 1.1 reproduces part of the ν_{2} emission band from a region of auroral activity in the upper atmosphere of Jupiter, and its Table 12.3 lists the transition wavenumbers of the lines in the band observed by Oka with their assignments.

In 1996, H^{+}_{3} was finally detected in the interstellar medium (ISM) by Geballe & Oka in two molecular interstellar clouds in the sightlines GL2136 and W33A. In 1998, H^{+}_{3} was unexpectedly detected by McCall et al. in a diffuse interstellar cloud in the sightline Cygnus OB2#12. In 2006 Oka announced that H^{+}_{3} was ubiquitous in interstellar medium, and that the Central Molecular Zone contained a million times the concentration of ISM generally.

== Structure ==
The structure of H^{+}_{3}

The MO diagram of the trihydrogen cation.

The three hydrogen atoms in the molecule form an equilateral triangle, with a bond length of 0.90 Å on each side. The bonding among the atoms is a three-center two-electron bond, a delocalized resonance hybrid type of structure. The strength of the bond has been calculated to be around 4.5 eV (104 kcal/mol).

=== Isotopologues ===
In theory, the cation has 10 isotopologues, resulting from the replacement of one or more protons by nuclei of the other hydrogen isotopes; namely, deuterium nuclei (deuterons, ^{2}H^{+}) or tritium nuclei (tritons, ^{3}H^{+}). Some of them have been detected in interstellar clouds. They differ in the atomic mass number A and the number of neutrons N:

- H^{+}_{3} = ^{1}H^{+}_{3} (A=3, N=0) (the common one).
- [DH_{2}]^{+} = [^{2}H^{1}H_{2}]^{+} (A=4, N=1) (deuterium dihydrogen cation).
- [D_{2}H]^{+} = [^{2}H_{2}^{1}H]^{+} (A=5, N=2) (dideuterium hydrogen cation).
- D^{+}_{3} = ^{2}H^{+}_{3} (A=6, N=3) (trideuterium cation).
- [TH_{2}]^{+} = [^{3}H^{1}H_{2}]^{+} (A=5, N=2) (tritium dihydrogen cation).
- [TDH]^{+} = [^{3}H^{2}H^{1}H]^{+} (A=6, N=3) (tritium deuterium hydrogen cation).
- [TD_{2}]^{+} = [^{3}H^{2}H_{2}]^{+} (A=7, N=4) (tritium dideuterium cation).
- [T_{2}H]^{+} = [^{3}H_{2}^{1}H]^{+} (A=7, N=4) (ditritium hydrogen cation).
- [T_{2}D]^{+} = [^{3}H_{2}^{2}H]^{+} (A=8, N=5) (ditritium deuterium cation).
- T^{+}_{3} = ^{3}H^{+}_{3} (A=9, N=6) (tritritium cation).

The deuterium isotopologues have been implicated in the fractionation of deuterium in dense interstellar cloud cores.

== Formation ==
The main pathway for the production of H^{+}_{3} is by the reaction of H^{+}_{2} and H_{2}.

H^{+}_{2} + H_{2} → H^{+}_{3} + H^{•}

The concentration of H^{+}_{2} is what limits the rate of this reaction in nature - the only known natural source of it is via ionization of H_{2} by a cosmic ray in interstellar space:

H_{2} + cosmic ray → H^{+}_{2} + e^{−} + cosmic ray

The cosmic ray has so much energy, it is almost unaffected by the relatively small energy transferred to the hydrogen when ionizing an H_{2} molecule. In interstellar clouds, cosmic rays leave behind a trail of H^{+}_{2}, and therefore H^{+}_{3}. In laboratories, H^{+}_{3} is produced by the same mechanism in plasma discharge cells, with the discharge potential providing the energy to ionize the H_{2}.

== Destruction ==
There are many destruction reactions for H^{+}_{3}. The dominant destruction pathway in dense interstellar clouds is by proton transfer with a neutral collision partner. The most likely candidate for a destructive collision partner is the second most abundant molecule in space, CO.

H^{+}_{3} + CO → HCO^{+} + H_{2}

The significant product of this reaction is HCO^{+}, an important molecule for interstellar chemistry. Its strong dipole and high abundance make it easily detectable by radio astronomy. H^{+}_{3} can also react with atomic oxygen to form OH^{+} and H_{2}.

H^{+}_{3} + O → OH^{+} + H_{2}

OH^{+} then usually reacts with more H_{2} to create further hydrogenated molecules.

OH^{+} + H_{2} → OH^{+}_{2} + H
OH^{+}_{2} + H_{2} → OH^{+}_{3} + H

At this point, the reaction between OH^{+}_{3} and H_{2} is no longer exothermic in interstellar clouds. The most common destruction pathway for OH^{+}_{3} is dissociative recombination, yielding four possible sets of products: H_{2}O + H, OH + H_{2}, OH + 2H, and O + H_{2} + H. While water is a possible product of this reaction, it is not a very efficient product. Different experiments have suggested that water is created anywhere from 5–33% of the time. Water formation on grains is still considered the primary source of water in the interstellar medium.

The most common destruction pathway of H^{+}_{3} in diffuse interstellar clouds is dissociative recombination. This reaction has multiple products. The major product is dissociation into three hydrogen atoms, which occurs roughly 75% of the time. The minor product is H_{2} and H, which occurs roughly 25% of the time.

== ortho/para-H^{+}_{3} ==
A collision of ortho-H^{+}_{3} and para-H_{2}.

The protons of [^{1}H_{3}]^{+} can be in two different spin configurations, called ortho and para. ortho-H^{+}_{3} has all three proton spins parallel, yielding a total nuclear spin of 3/2. para-H^{+}_{3} has two proton spins parallel while the other is antiparallel, yielding a total nuclear spin of 1/2.

The most abundant molecule in dense interstellar clouds is ^{1}H_{2} which also has ortho and para states, with total nuclear spins 1 and 0, respectively. When a H^{+}_{3} molecule collides with a H_{2} molecule, a proton transfer can take place. The transfer still yields a H^{+}_{3} molecule and a H_{2} molecule, but can potentially change the total nuclear spin of the two molecules depending on the nuclear spins of the protons. When an ortho-H^{+}_{3} and a para-H_{2} collide, the result may be a para-H^{+}_{3} and an ortho-H_{2}.

== Spectroscopy ==
The spectroscopy of H^{+}_{3} is challenging. The pure rotational spectrum is exceedingly weak. Ultraviolet light is too energetic and would dissociate the molecule. Rovibronic (infrared) spectroscopy provides the ability to observe H^{+}_{3}. Rovibronic spectroscopy is possible with H^{+}_{3} because one of the vibrational modes of H^{+}_{3}, the ν_{2} asymmetric bend mode (see example of ν_{2}) has a weak transition dipole moment. Since Oka's initial spectrum, over 900 absorption lines have been detected in the infrared region. H^{+}_{3} emission lines have also been found by observing the atmospheres of the Jovian planets. H^{+}_{3} emission lines are found by observing molecular hydrogen and finding a line that cannot be attributed to molecular hydrogen.

== Astronomical detection ==
H^{+}_{3} has been detected in two types of the universe environments: jovian planets and interstellar clouds. In jovian planets, it has been detected in the planets' ionospheres, the region where the Sun's high energy radiation ionizes the particles in the planets' atmospheres. Since there is a high level of H_{2} in these atmospheres, this radiation can produce a significant amount of H^{+}_{3}. Also, with a broadband source like the Sun, there is plenty of radiation to pump the H^{+}_{3} to higher energy states from which it can relax by spontaneous emission.

=== Planetary atmospheres ===
The detection of the first H^{+}_{3} emission lines was reported in 1989 by Drossart et al., found in the ionosphere of Jupiter. Drossart found a total of 23 H^{+}_{3} lines with a column density of 1.39×10^{9} /cm^{2}. Using these lines, they were able to assign a temperature to the H^{+}_{3} of around 1,100 K (830 °C), which is comparable to temperatures determined from emission lines of other species like H_{2}. In 1993, H^{+}_{3} was found in Saturn by Geballe et al. and in Uranus by Trafton et al. Over 30 years later, H^{+}_{3} was discovered at Neptune by Melin et al.; this finding required the high spatial resolution of the James Webb Space Telescope to distinguish H^{+}_{3} emission from sunlight-reflecting clouds.

=== Molecular interstellar clouds ===
H^{+}_{3} was not detected in the interstellar medium until 1996, when Geballe & Oka reported the detection of H^{+}_{3} in two molecular cloud sightlines, GL 2136 and W33A. Both sources had temperatures of H^{+}_{3} of about 35 K (−238 °C) and column densities of about 10^{14}/cm^{2}. Since then, H^{+}_{3} has been detected in numerous other molecular cloud sightlines, such as AFGL 2136, Mon R2 IRS 3, GCS 3–2, GC IRS 3, and LkHα 101.

=== Diffuse interstellar clouds ===
Unexpectedly, three H^{+}_{3} lines were detected in 1998 by McCall et al. in the diffuse interstellar cloud sightline of Cygnus OB2 #12. Before 1998, the density of H_{2} was thought to be too low to produce a detectable amount of H^{+}_{3}. McCall detected a temperature of ~27 K (−246 °C) and a column density of ~10^{14}/cm^{2}, the same column density as Geballe & Oka. Since then, H^{+}_{3} has been detected in many other diffuse cloud sightlines, such as GCS 3–2, GC IRS 3, and ζ Persei.

=== Steady-state model predictions ===
To approximate the path length of H^{+}_{3} in these clouds, Oka used the steady-state model to determine the predicted number densities in diffuse and dense clouds. As explained above, both diffuse and dense clouds have the same formation mechanism for H^{+}_{3}, but different dominating destruction mechanisms. In dense clouds, proton transfer with CO is the dominating destruction mechanism. This corresponds to a predicted number density of 10^{−4} cm^{−3} in dense clouds.

$$\begin{align}
n(\ce{H3+}) &= \frac{\zeta}{k_\ce{CO}} \left[ \frac{n(\ce{H2})}{n(\ce{CO})} \right] \approx 10^{-4}/\text{cm}^3 \\
n(\ce{H3+}) &= \frac{\zeta}{k_\ce{e}} \left[ \frac{n(\ce{H2})}{n(\ce{C+})} \right] \approx 10^{-6}/\text{cm}^3
\end{align}$$

In diffuse clouds, the dominating destruction mechanism is dissociative recombination. This corresponds to a predicted number density of 10^{−6}/cm^{3} in diffuse clouds. Therefore, since column densities for diffuse and dense clouds are roughly the same order of magnitude, diffuse clouds must have a path length 100 times greater than that for dense clouds. Therefore, by using H^{+}_{3} as a probe of these clouds, their relative sizes can be determined.

== See also ==
- Dihydrogen cation, H^{+}_{2}
- Helium hydride ion, [HeH]^{+}
