= W33A =

Protostar in the constellation Sagittarius

Observation data Epoch J2000.0 Equinox ICRS
- Constellation: Sagittarius
- Right ascension: 18^{h} 14^{m} 39.5^{s}
- Declination: −17° 52′ 02″

Database references
SIMBAD	data

W33A is a protostar located approximately 12,000 light-years away from Earth, in the constellation Sagittarius. As a star in the early stages of formation, so has attracted the interest of astronomers, who observed that while the protostar is accumulating material from surrounding clouds of gas and dust, it is simultaneously ejecting fast moving jets of particles from its north and south poles.
