= Gerald Wendt =

- Born: Gerald L. Wendt; 1891
- Died: 1973 (aged 81–82)
- Education: Harvard College
- Scientific career
- Fields: Chemistry
- Workplaces: Rice University; University of Chicago

Gerald L. Wendt (1891-1973) was a chemist who became a writer and lecturer on popular science. He was director of science and education at the New York World's Fair, an editor at Time magazine and Science Illustrated, and worked for UNESCO.

Gerald Louis Wendt was born on 3 Mar 1891 in Davenport, Iowa. He was married twice and had a son by his first marriage. He died on 22 December 1973.

Wendt graduated from Harvard with a BA (1913) and a PhD (1916) in chemistry. He saw war service as a researcher for the Army in the Chemical Warfare Service, and taught at the Rice Institute and the University of Chicago.

Wendt spent many years as a public lecturer and writer and was by 1938 a serious public scientist. He became director of The American Institute of New York City in 1937. He was director of science and education at the New York World's Fair between 1938 and 1940, promoting an optimistic vision of the future.

== Books ==
- Science for the World of Tomorrow (1939)
- Nuclear energy and Its Uses in Peace (1950)
- You and the Atom (1955)
- Atomic Energy and the Hydrogen Bomb (1956)
- The Prospects of Nuclear Power and Technology (1957)
