= Hydrogen deuteride =

- Skeletal formula of hydrogen deuteride

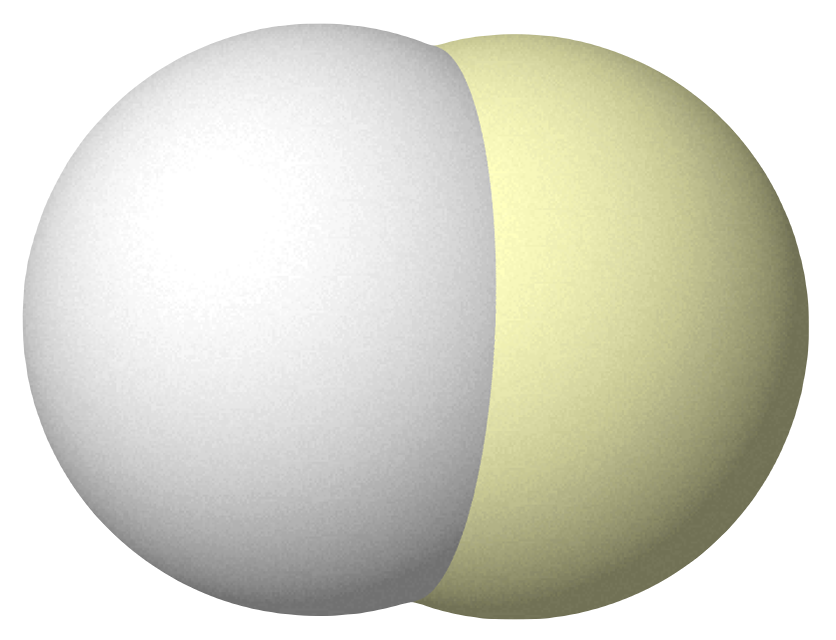

Names
- IUPAC name Hydrogen deuteride
- Systematic IUPAC name (^{2}H)Dihydrogen

Identifiers
CAS Number	13983-20-5
3D model (JSmol)	Interactive image
ChemSpider	146609
ECHA InfoCard	100.034.325
EC Number	237-773-0
PubChem CID	167583
UN number	1049
CompTox Dashboard (EPA)	DTXSID001027186
- InChI: InChI=1S/H2/h1H/i1+1 Key: UFHFLCQGNIYNRP-OUBTZVSYSA-N; InChI=1/H2/h1H/i1+1 Key: UFHFLCQGNIYNRP-OUBTZVSYED
- SMILES: [2H][H]

Properties
Chemical formula	HD
Molar mass	3.02204 g mol^{−1}
Melting point	−259 °C (−434.2 °F; 14.1 K)
Boiling point	−253 °C (−423.4 °F; 20.1 K)

Hazards
- GHS labelling
Pictograms	(GHS02: Flammable) (GHS04: Compressed Gas)
Signal word	Danger
Hazard statements	H220, H280
Precautionary statements	P210, P377, P381, P403, P410+P403
NFPA 704 (fire diamond)	0 4 0
Autoignition temperature	571 °C (1,060 °F; 844 K)

Related compounds
Related hydrogens	Deuterium Hydrogen; Tritium
- Except where otherwise noted, data are given for materials in their standard state (at 25 °C [77 °F], 100 kPa). verify (what is ?) Infobox references

Hydrogen deuteride is an isotopologue of dihydrogen composed of two isotopes of hydrogen: the majority isotope ^{1}H (protium) and ^{2}H (deuterium). Its proper molecular formula is ^{1}H^{2}H, but for simplification, it is usually written as HD.

== Preparation and occurrence ==
In the laboratory it is produced by treating sodium hydride with deuterated water:

NaH + D_{2}O → HD + NaOD

Hydrogen deuteride is a minor component of naturally occurring molecular hydrogen. It is one of the minor but noticeable components of the atmospheres of all the giant planets, with abundances from about 30 ppm to about 200 ppm. HD has also been found in supernova remnants, dense interstellar clouds, and protoplanetary disks.

Occurrence of HD vs. H_{2} in giant planets' atmospheres
Planet	HD	H_{2}
Jupiter	~0.003%	89.8% ±2.0%
Uranus	~0.015%	82.5% ±3.3%
Neptune	~0.019%	80.0% ±3.2%

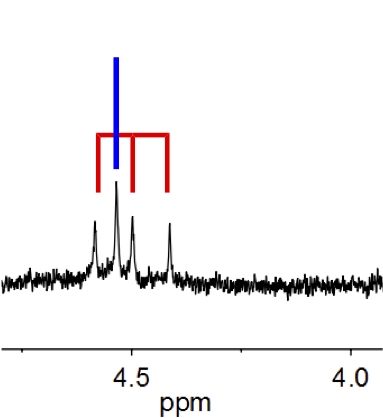
H NMR spectrum of a solution of HD (labeled with red bars) and H_{2} (blue bar). The 1:1:1 triplet arises from the coupling of the ^{1}H nucleus (I = 1/2) to the ^{2}H nucleus ( I = 1).

== Radio emission spectra ==
HD and H_{2} have very similar emission spectra, but the emission frequencies differ.

The frequency of the astronomically important J = 1-0 rotational transition of HD at 2.7 THz has been measured with tunable FIR radiation with an accuracy of 150 kHz. In astronomy, this J = 1-0 line has been used to determine the masses of protoplanetary disks surrounding T Tauri stars and Herbig Ae/Be stars.
