= Cyano radical =

- Structural formula of a minor contributor to cyano radical

Names
- Preferred IUPAC name Nitridocarbon
- Other names Cyanyl; Nitrile; Cyano; Isocyano; Azanylidynemethyl

Identifiers
| CAS Number | 2074-87-5 |
| 3D model (JSmol) | Interactive image |
| Beilstein Reference | 1697323 |
| ChEBI | CHEBI:29306 |
| ChemSpider | 4514240 |
| Gmelin Reference | 88 |
| PubChem CID | 5359238 |
- InChI: InChI=1S/CN/c1-2 Key: JEVCWSUVFOYBFI-UHFFFAOYSA-N
- SMILES: [C]#N

Properties
| Chemical formula | ^{·}CN |
| Molar mass | 26.018 g·mol^{−1} |
- Except where otherwise noted, data are given for materials in their standard state (at 25 °C [77 °F], 100 kPa). verify (what is ?) Infobox references

The cyano radical (or cyanido radical) is a radical with molecular formula CN, sometimes written ^{•}CN. The cyano radical was one of the first detected molecules in the interstellar medium, in 1938. Its detection and analysis was influential in astrochemistry. The discovery was confirmed with a coudé spectrograph, which was made famous and credible due to this detection. ·CN has been observed in both diffuse clouds and dense clouds. Usually, CN is detected in regions with hydrogen cyanide, hydrogen isocyanide, and HCNH^{+}, since it is involved in the creation and destruction of these species (see also Cyanogen).

== Physical properties ==
Bonding in the cyano radical can be described as a combination of two resonance structures: the structure with the unpaired electron on the carbon is the minor contributor, while the structure with the unpaired electron on the nitrogen (the isocyano radical) is the major contributor. The charge separation in the isocyano radical is similar to that of carbon monoxide. ^{•}CN has a dipole moment of 1.45 debyes and a ^{2}Σ^{+} ground electronic state. The selection rules are:

$$\begin{align} N + S &= J \\ J + I &= F \end{align}$$

where N is the angular momentum, S is the electric spin, and I = 1 is the nuclear spin of ^{14}N.

== Formation and destruction of ^{•}CN ==
=== Formation ===
- Dissociative recombination in diffuse clouds:
  HCN^{+} + e^{−} → ^{•}CN + H^{•}
- Photodissociation in dense clouds:
  HCN + hν → ^{•}CN + H^{•}

=== Destruction ===
H^{+}_{3} + ^{•}CN → HCN + H_{2}

== Detections of ^{•}CN ==
A spectral line of ^{•}CN was detected in 1938 in the interstellar medium in the ultraviolet, and was identified in 1940 by Andrew McKellar. The coudé spectrograph and a 100-inch (2.5 m) telescope were used to observe ^{•}CN's interstellar lines and ultraviolet spectra. Use of the spectrograph confirmed McKellar's findings and also made the spectrograph famous. In 1970, ^{•}CN's first rotational transition from J = 0 to J = 1 was detected In the Orion Nebula and the W51 nebula. The first detection of ^{•}CN in extragalactic sources were seen toward Sculptor Galaxy (NGC 253), IC 342, and M82 In 1988. These emission lines seen were from N = 1 to N = 0 and N = 2 to N = 1. In 1991, the ^{•}CN vibration-rotational bands were observed in a king furnace at the National Solar Observatory using a McMath Fourier-Transform spectrometer. The observed 2 to 0 lines show an extreme hyperfine structure. In 1995, the rotational absorption spectrum of ·CN in the ground state was observed in the 1 THz region, and most of the lines were measured in the range of 560 to 1020 GHz. Four new rotational transitions were measured; N = 8 to N = 8, J = 15/2 to J = 17/2 and J = 17/2 to J = 19/2; N = 7 to N = 8, J = 15/2 to J = 17/2 and J = 13/2 to J = 15/2.
