= Diazenylium =

Chemical compound

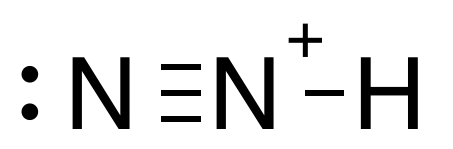

Diazenylium is the chemical N_{2}H^{+}, an inorganic cation that was one of the first ions to be observed in interstellar clouds. Since then, it has been observed in several different types of interstellar environments, observations that have several different scientific uses. It gives astronomers information about the fractional ionization of gas clouds, the chemistry that happens within those clouds, and it is often used as a tracer for molecules that are not as easily detected (such as N_{2}). Its 1–0 rotational transition occurs at 93.174 GHz, a region of the spectrum where Earth's atmosphere is transparent and it has a significant optical depth in both cold and warm clouds so it is relatively easy to observe with ground-based observatories. The results of N_{2}H^{+} observations can be used not only for determining the chemistry of interstellar clouds, but also for mapping the density and velocity profiles of these clouds.

== Astronomical detections ==
N_{2}H^{+} was first observed in 1974 by B.E. Turner. He observed a previously unidentified triplet at 93.174 GHz using the NRAO 11 m telescope. Immediately after this initial observation, Green et al. identified the triplet as the 1–0 rotational transition of N_{2}H^{+}. This was done using a combination of ab initio molecular calculations and comparison of similar molecules, such as N_{2}, CO, HCN, HNC, and HCO^{+}, which are all isoelectronic to N_{2}H^{+}. Based on these calculations, the observed rotational transition would be expected to have seven hyperfine components, but only three of these were observed, since the telescope's resolution was insufficient to distinguish the peaks caused by the hyperfine splitting of the inner Nitrogen atom. Just a year later, Thaddeus and Turner observed the same transition in the Orion molecular cloud 2 (OMC-2) using the same telescope, but this time they integrated for 26 hours, which resulted in a resolution that was good enough to distinguish the smaller hyperfine components.

Over the past three decades, N_{2}H^{+} has been observed quite frequently, and the 1–0 rotational band is almost exclusively the one that astronomers look for. In 1995, the hyperfine structure of this septuplet was observed with an absolute precision of ~7 kHz, which was good enough to determine its molecular constants with an order of magnitude better precision than was possible in the laboratory. This observation was done toward L1512 using the 37 m NEROC Haystack Telescope. In the same year, Sage et al. observed the 1–0 transition of N_{2}H^{+} in seven out of the nine nearby galaxies that they observed with the NRAO 12 m telescope at Kitt Peak. N_{2}H^{+} was one of the first few molecular ions to be observed in other galaxies, and its observation helped to show that the chemistry in other galaxies is quite similar to that which we see in our own galaxy.

N_{2}H^{+} is most often observed in dense molecular clouds, where it has proven useful as one of the last molecules to freeze out onto dust grains as the density of the cloud increases toward the center. In 2002, Bergin et al. did a spatial survey of dense cores to see just how far toward the center N_{2}H^{+} could be observed and found that its abundance drops by at least two orders of magnitude when one moves from the outer edge of the core to the center. This showed that even N_{2}H^{+} is not an ideal tracer for the chemistry of dense pre-stellar cores, and concluded that H_{2}D^{+} may be the only good molecular probe of the innermost regions of pre-stellar cores.

== Laboratory detections ==
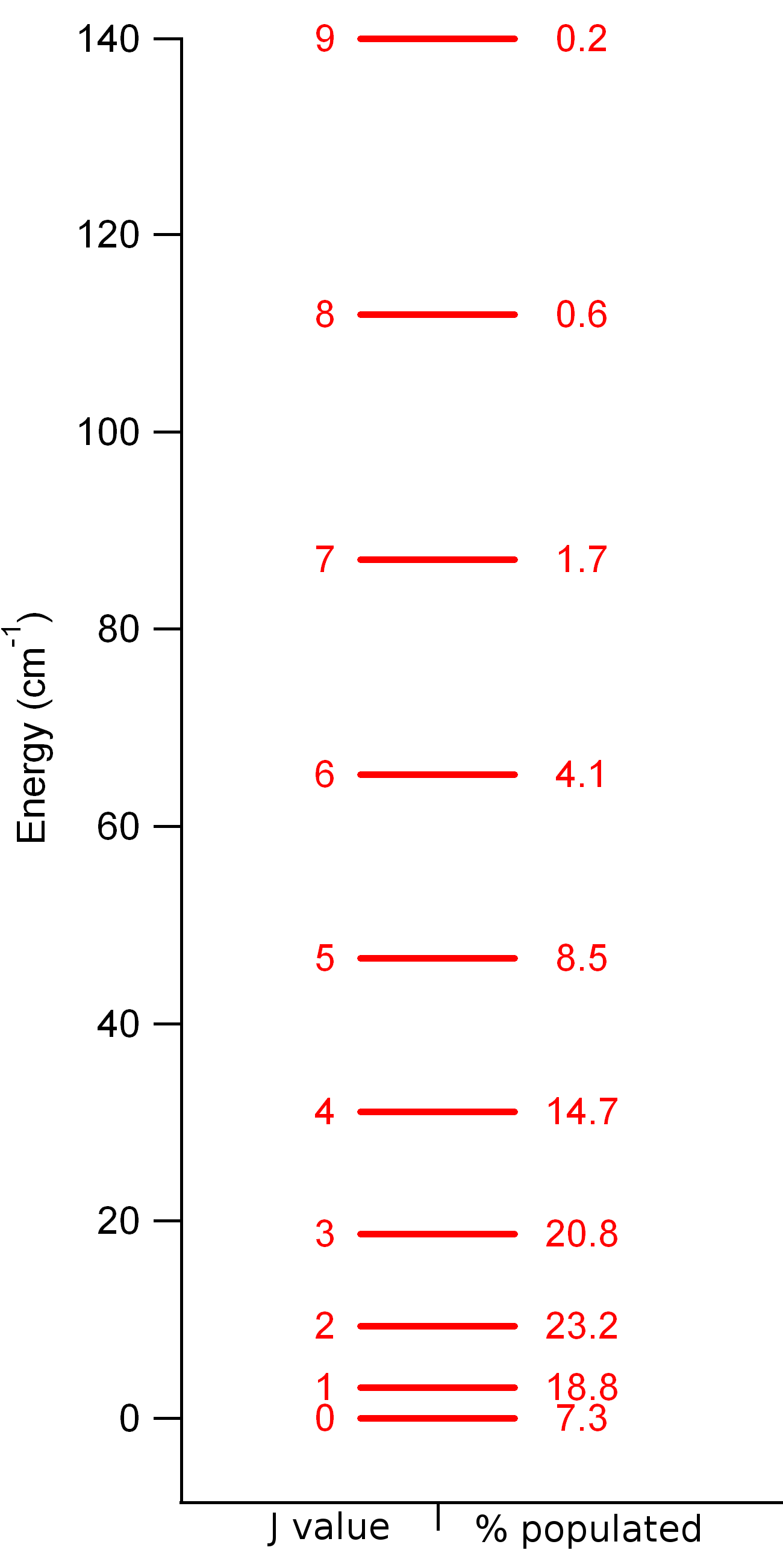
N_{2}H^{+} Energy Levels

Although N_{2}H^{+} is most often observed by astronomers because of its ease of detection, there have been some laboratory experiments that have observed it in a more controlled environment. The first laboratory spectrum of N_{2}H^{+} was of the 1–0 rotational band in the ground vibrational level, the same microwave transition that astronomers had recently discovered in space.

Ten years later, Owrutsky et al. performed vibrational spectroscopy of N_{2}H^{+} by observing the plasma created by a discharge of a mixture nitrogen, hydrogen, and argon gas using a color center laser. During the pulsed discharge, the poles were reversed on alternating pulses, so the ions were pulled back and forth through the discharge cell. This caused the absorption features of the ions, but not the neutral molecules, to be shifted back and forth in frequency space, so a lock-in amplifier could be used to observe the spectra of just the ions in the discharge. The lock-in combined with the velocity modulation gave >99.9% discrimination between ions and neutrals. The feed gas was optimized for N_{2}H^{+} production, and transitions up to J = 41 were observed for both the fundamental N–H stretching band and the bending hot band.

Later, Kabbadj et al. observed even more hot bands associated with the fundamental vibrational band using a difference frequency laser to observe a discharge of a mixture of nitrogen, hydrogen, and helium gases. They used velocity modulation in the same way that Owrutsky et al. had, in order to discriminate ions from neutrals. They combined this with a counterpropagating beam technique to aid in noise subtraction, and this greatly increased their sensitivity. They had enough sensitivity to observe OH^{+}, H_{2}O^{+}, and H_{3}O^{+} that were formed from the minute O_{2} and H_{2}O impurities in their helium tank.

Simulated N_{2}H^{+} Rotational Spectrum

By fitting all observed bands, the rotational constants for N_{2}H^{+} were determined to be B_{e} = 1.561928 cm^{−1} and D_{e} = 2.746×10^{−6} cm^{−1}, which are the only constants needed to determine the rotational spectrum of this linear molecule in the ground vibrational state, with the exception of determining hyperfine splitting. Given the selection rule ΔJ = ±1, the calculated rotational energy levels, along with their percent population at 30 kelvins, can be plotted. The frequencies of the peaks predicted by this method differ from those observed in the laboratory by at most 700 kHz.

== Chemistry ==
N_{2}H^{+} is found mostly in dense molecular clouds, where its presence is closely related to that of many other nitrogen-containing compounds. It is particularly closely tied to the chemistry of N_{2}, which is more difficult to detect (since it lacks a dipole moment). This is why N_{2}H^{+} is commonly used to indirectly determine the abundance of N_{2} in molecular clouds.

The rates of the dominant formation and destruction reactions can be determined from known rate constants and fractional abundances (relative to H_{2}) in a typical dense molecular cloud. The calculated rates here were for early time (316,000 years) and a temperature of 20 kelvins, which are typical conditions for a relatively young molecular cloud.

Production of diazenylium
Reaction	Rate constant	Rate/[H_{2}]^{2}	Relative rate
H_{2} + N^{+}_{2} → N_{2}H^{+} + H	2.0×10^{−9}	1.7×10^{−23}	1.0
H^{+}_{3} + N_{2} → N_{2}H^{+} + H_{2}	1.8×10^{−9}	1.5×10^{−22}	9.1

Destruction of diazenylium
Reaction	Rate constant	Rate/[H_{2}]^{2}	Relative rate
N_{2}H^{+} + O → N_{2} + OH^{+}	1.4×10^{−10}	1.6×10^{−23}	1.0
N_{2}H^{+} + CO → N_{2} + HCO^{+}	1.4×10^{−10}	5.0×10^{−23}	3.2
N_{2}H^{+} + e^{–} → N_{2} + H	2.0×10^{−6}	4.4×10^{−23}	2.8
N_{2}H^{+} + e^{–} → NHN	2.6×10^{−6}	5.7×10^{−23}	3.7

There are dozens more reactions possible, but these are the only ones that are fast enough to affect the abundance of N_{2}H^{+} in dense molecular clouds. Diazenylium thus plays a critical role in the chemistry of many nitrogen-containing molecules. Although the actual electron density in so-called "dense clouds" is quite low, the destruction of N_{2}H^{+} is governed mostly by dissociative recombination.
