= C3H3N3 =

The molecular formula C_{3}H_{3}N_{3} may refer to:

- Aminomalononitrile
- Triazine
