= C/2012 F6 (Lemmon) =

Non-periodic comet

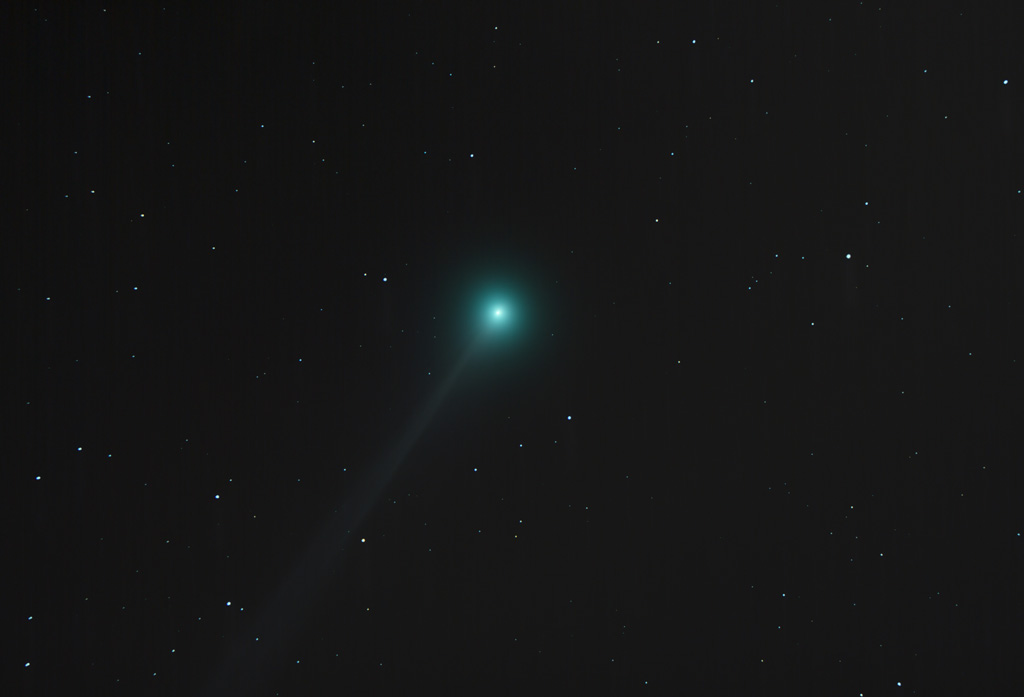
- Comet Lemmon in Tucana on 16 February 2013

Discovery
- Discovered by: Mount Lemmon Survey (Alex R. Gibbs)
- Discovery site: Tucson, Arizona (G96)
- Discovery date: 23 March 2012

Orbital characteristics
- Epoch: 29 July 2013 (JD 2456502.5)
- Observation arc: 2.72 years
- Earliest precovery date: 22 January 2012
- Number of observations: 3,201
- Aphelion: ~970 AU
- Perihelion: 0.731 AU
- Semi-major axis: ~487 AU
- Eccentricity: 0.99849
- Orbital period: ~8,000 years (outbound)
- Inclination: 82.609°
- Longitude of ascending node: 332.72°
- Argument of periapsis: 304.99°
- Mean anomaly: 0.012°
- Last perihelion: 24 March 2013
- T_{Jupiter}: 0.147
- Earth MOID: 0.072 AU
- Jupiter MOID: 0.905 AU

Physical characteristics
- Mean radius: 2.151 ± 0.133 km (1.337 ± 0.083 mi)
- Mean density: 460±60 kg/m^{3}
- Synodic rotation period: 9.52±0.05 hours
- Comet total magnitude (M1): 5.6
- Comet nuclear magnitude (M2): 11.1

C/2012 F6 (Lemmon) is a long-period comet discovered in Leo on 23 March 2012, by Alex R. Gibbs using the 1.5-m reflector at the Mount Lemmon Survey, located at the summit of Mount Lemmon in the Santa Catalina Mountains north of Tucson, Arizona, USA. Initially, the object was considered to be of asteroidal nature before later observations confirmed its cometary appearance. Comet Lemmon has a highly eccentric orbit, bringing it as close to 0.73 AU from the Sun at perihelion and as far as 973 AU from the Sun at aphelion. This also leads to the comet's long-period nature with an orbital period of approximately 8,000 years based on epoch 2050. The comet last reached perihelion on 24 March 2013.

For much of 2012, observation of Lemmon remained limited to CCD imagery, but steadily brightened throughout the course of the year. In late-November 2012, the comet became bright enough for telescopic viewing, and had an apparent magnitude estimated at +9 by the year's end. Brightening continued into the early months of 2013 before peaking at an apparent magnitude of +5 in late March, though viewing was mostly limited to the Southern Hemisphere. On 24 March 2013, Lemmon reached its orbital perihelion and afterwards began to dim. On 20 April 2013, Lemmon crossed the celestial equator and became primarily viewable in the Northern Hemisphere, though by this time the comet was significantly dimmer relative to its peak brightness.

== Discovery ==
A.R. Gibbs of the Mount Lemmon Observatory in Arizona discovered the comet based on images acquired by the sky survey's 1.5-m reflecting telescope on 23 March 2012. However, Gibbs did not recognize its cometary appearance and was listed as an asteroid on the Minor Planet Center's Near-Earth Object Confirmation Page. At the time, the apparent magnitude of the comet was estimated between +20.6 and +20.8. Shortly after initial discovery, amateur astronomer Peter Birtwhistle in Great Shefford observed the comet using a 40-cm refracting telescope and CCD images, estimating an apparent magnitude of +20.1 and a diameter stretching 5 arc seconds across.

== Observational history ==
Following discovery, Lemmon remained a dim object but steadily brightened over the next few months. The comet was last sighted on 14 June 2012 with an apparent magnitude estimated at +19.0 before it was lost in the Sun's glare. On 25 August, the comet was analyzed to have passed an apparent 0.7 degrees from the Sun. The comet was re-sighted on 14 October utilizing the RAS (Remote Astronomical Society) Observatory of New Mexico in Mayhill, with an apparent magnitude estimated to have brightened to +15.3. The first confirmed visual observation of the comet without the use of CCD imagery was conducted by Juan Jose Gonzalez Suarez in Cantabria, Spain using a 20-cm reflector on 22 November. Several other visual confirmations were made throughout the rest of the year. By the end of 2012, the comet had a coma 5-7 arc minutes across and an apparent magnitude estimated at +9.

It was well placed for viewing in the Southern Hemisphere in January 2013 to observe it brightening, crossing Centaurus, Crux and Chamaeleon, and into February when it was circumpolar in Octans. By the end of February it set early evening situated in Phoenix, was observable well into March. After perihelion the comet should be reasonably well placed in the morning sky to observe as it fades. The comet was visible in the STEREO heliospheric imager HI-2A starting on 17 April. C/2012 F6 crossed the celestial equator on 20 April 2013 becoming a Northern Hemisphere object. On 9 May 2013 the comet was near Gamma Pegasi and from a dark sky was visible in binoculars before sunrise low in the eastern sky.

On 11 August 2014, astronomers released studies, using the Atacama Large Millimeter/Submillimeter Array (ALMA) for the first time, that detailed the distribution of HCN, HNC, H_{2}CO, and dust inside the comae of comets C/2012 F6 (Lemmon) and C/2012 S1 (ISON).

== Gallery ==
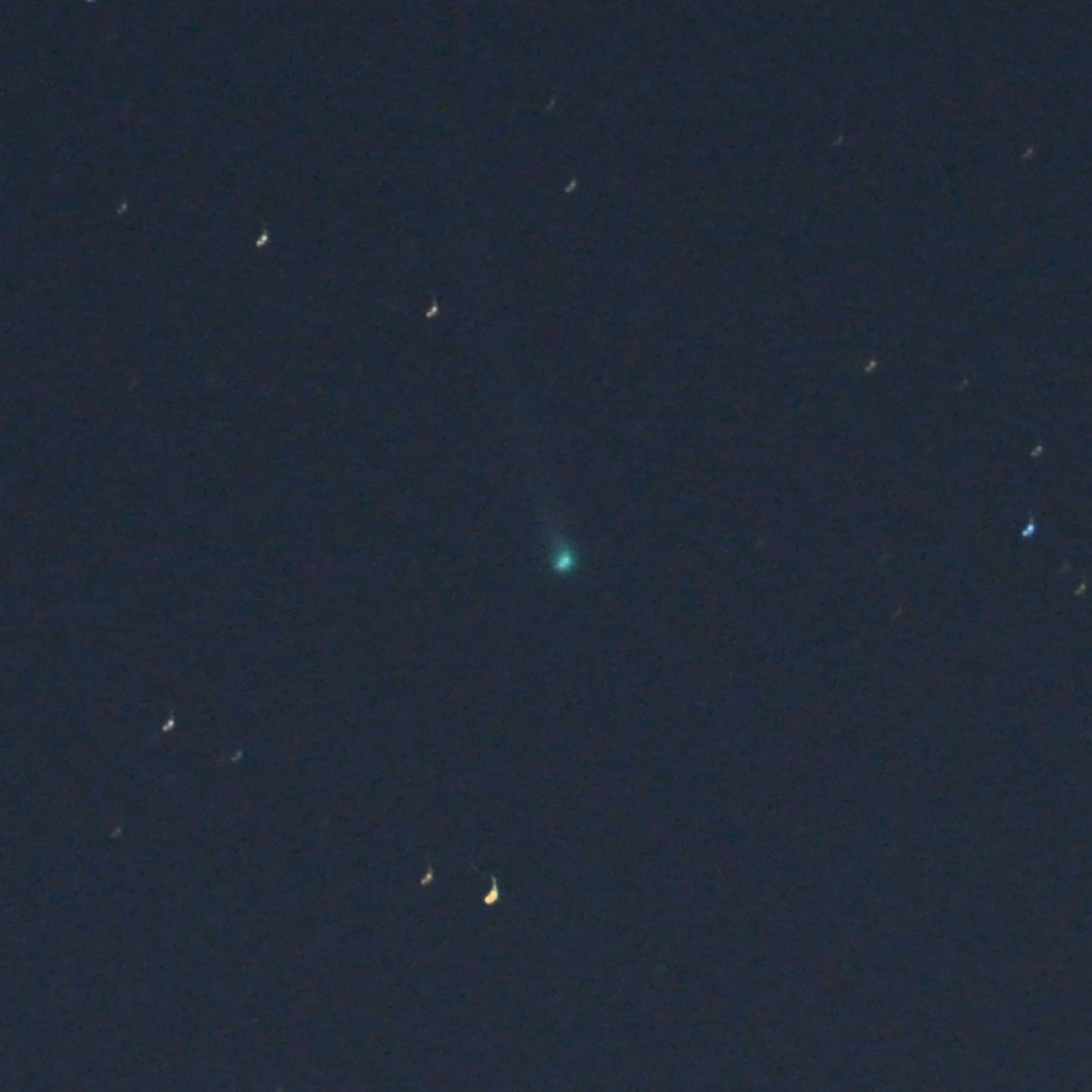
Comet Lemmon on 1 March from Mount Burnett Observatory

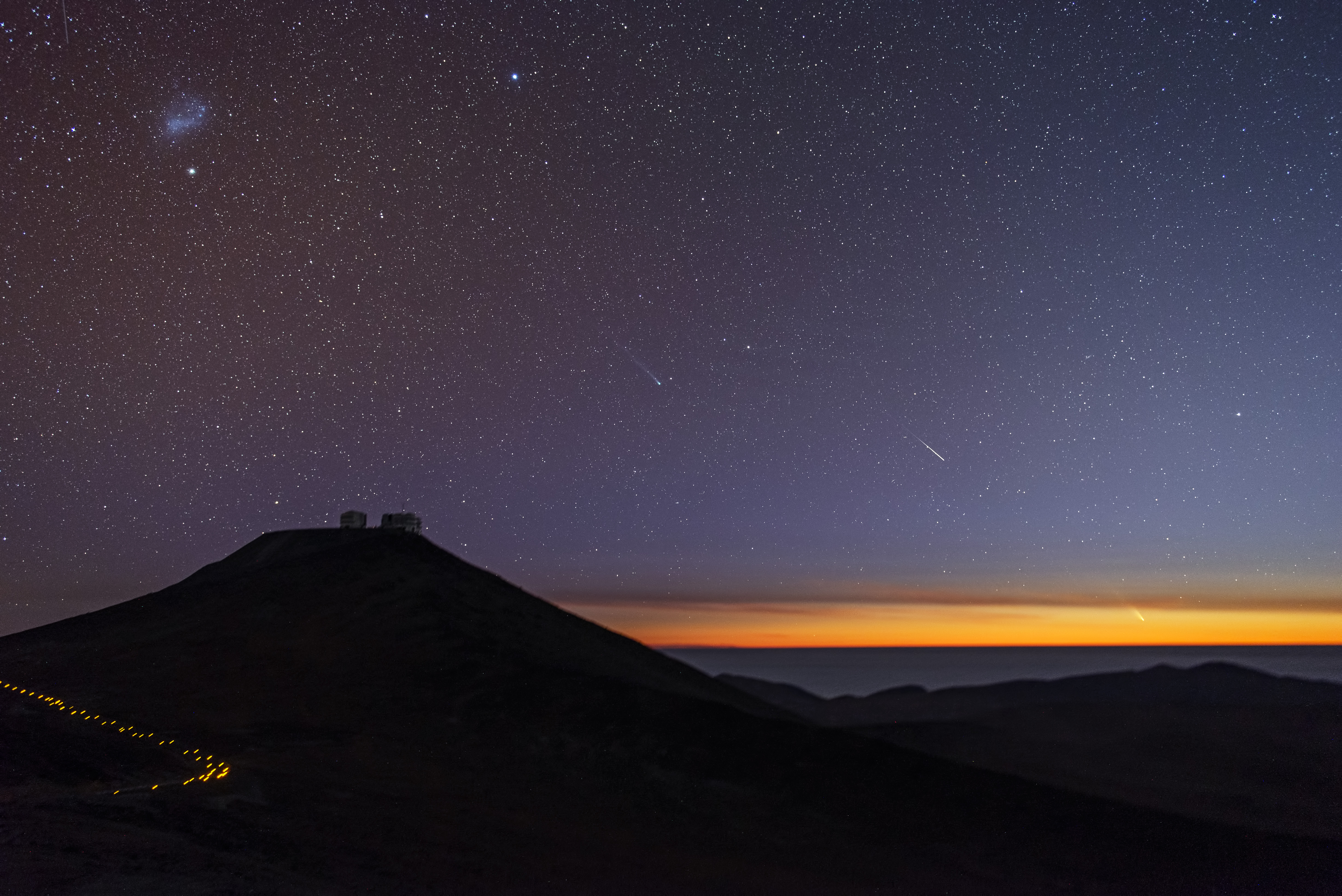
Lemmon in conjunction with C/2011 L4 and a meteoroid trail from Paranal Observatory on 5 March
