= BRRISON =

2013 NASA project to study comet ISON

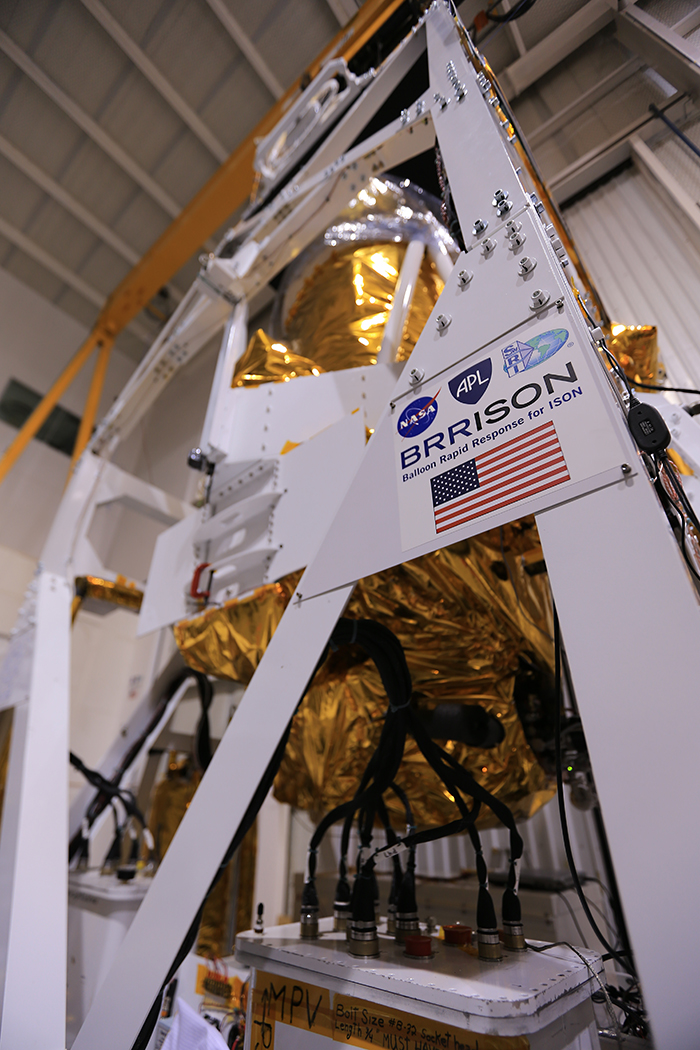
- BRRISON prior to launch
- Location(s): United States
- Related media on Commons

The Balloon Rapid Response for ISON (BRRISON) was a NASA project involving a stratospheric balloon with science instruments intended to study comet C/2012 S1 (ISON) and other celestial objects.

== Construction ==
The balloon featured an azimuth and attitude stabilized gondola carrying an 80-centimeter (31 in) telescope and two instruments on separate optical benches. The Johns Hopkins University Applied Physics Laboratory contributed the BRRISON Infrared Camera (BIRC) for detecting water and carbon dioxide at 2.5 to 5 μm. The Southwest Research Institute provided the Ultraviolet-Visible light camera (UVVis) with a fine steering mirror to detect hydroxyl (308 nm) and cyanogen (385 nm) emissions. To save time, both the telescope and gondola avionics were refurbished from JHU/APL's Stratospheric Terahertz Observatory mission. The BRRISON payload was intended to operate at 36,600 meters (120,000 ft) for up to 22 hours. The mission cost US$10.2 million, excluding the balloon and NASA personnel expenses, and progressed from concept to launch pad in ten months.

== Mission ==
While Comet ISON was the primary target, this mission also planned to observe other objects, including comet 2P/Encke, Jupiter and its moons, the Mizar star system, Earth's Moon, and asteroids 10 Hygiea and 130 Elektra. Another goal was to measure Earth's atmospheric transmission and emission using BIRC and atmospheric turbulence using UVVis.

== Launch ==
The balloon was launched from the Columbia Scientific Balloon Facility at Fort Sumner, New Mexico, on 28 September 2013 at 18:10 MDT (29 September 2013 at 00:10 UTC). However, about two and a half hours after launch, a communication interruption between hardware caused the telescope to return to its stowed position too rapidly, resulting in the stow bar being trapped. Team members worked to fix the problem, but the telescope was unable to be redeployed. The decision was made to keep the balloon afloat until it reached a safe location for mission termination, which occurred on 29 September at 06:04 MDT (12:04 UTC). The gondola and its payload was released under parachute and recovered near Spur, Texas, in "excellent condition". The hardware may be reused on future balloon missions.
