= Diaminomaleonitrile =

Names
- Preferred IUPAC name (2Z)-2,3-Diaminobut-2-enedinitrile
- Other names 2,3-Diaminomaleonitrile; Hydrogen cyanide tetramer

Identifiers
CAS Number	1187-42-4
3D model (JSmol)	Interactive image
ChemSpider	2006128
ECHA InfoCard	100.013.361
PubChem CID	2723951
UNII	E8C63N8TWR
CompTox Dashboard (EPA)	DTXSID0024923
- InChI: InChI=1S/C4H4N4/c5-1-3(7)4(8)2-6/h7-8H2/b4-3- Key: DPZSNGJNFHWQDC-ARJAWSKDSA-N
- SMILES: C(#N)/C(=C(\C#N)/N)/N

Properties
Chemical formula	C_{4}H_{4}N_{4}
Molar mass	108.104 g·mol^{−1}
Appearance	white solid
Melting point	178–179 °C (352–354 °F; 451–452 K)
- Except where otherwise noted, data are given for materials in their standard state (at 25 °C [77 °F], 100 kPa). Infobox references

Diaminomaleonitrile (DAMN) is an organic compound composed of two amino groups and two nitrile groups bonded to a central alkene unit. The systematic name reflects its relationship to maleic acid. DAMN forms by oligomerization of hydrogen cyanide. It is the starting point for the synthesis of several classes of heterocyclic compounds. It has been considered as a possible organic chemical present in prebiotic conditions.

== Isolation and synthesis ==
Diaminomaleonitrile was first isolated in 1873 as an impure black solid, when it was recognized as a derivative of hydrogen cyanide with the formula (HCN)_{x}. It was identified as the tetramer (HCN)_{4} by ebullioscopy in 1923. The cis-configuration of the amino groups was shown in 1928 through reaction with glyoxal to give 2,3-dicyanopyrazine, and the full structure was shown in 1955 to be diaminomaleonitrile, as opposed to the isomeric aminoiminosuccinonitrile (AISN).

It can be prepared by cyanation of aminomalononitrile.

== Possible role in abiogenesis ==
Diaminomaleonitrile has been proposed since the 1960s as a key substance for the prebiotic synthesis of nucleobases. Photochemical rearrangement of DAMN under UV light gives 4-aminoimidazole-5-carbonitrile (AICN), which can react further to form various nucleobases.

Early experiments have also suggested that certain amino acids, such as aspartic acid, alanine, and glycine, may have their probiotic origins in the acidic hydrolysis of diaminomaleonitrile.

Due to the ubiquity of hydrogen cyanide and its oligomers in space, it has been proposed that the dark material found in comets may consist of diaminomaleonitrile and higher oligomers, and that such polymers of HCN may have covered the surface of the early Earth.
