= Comet ISON =

Oort cloud comet

C/2012 S1 (ISON)
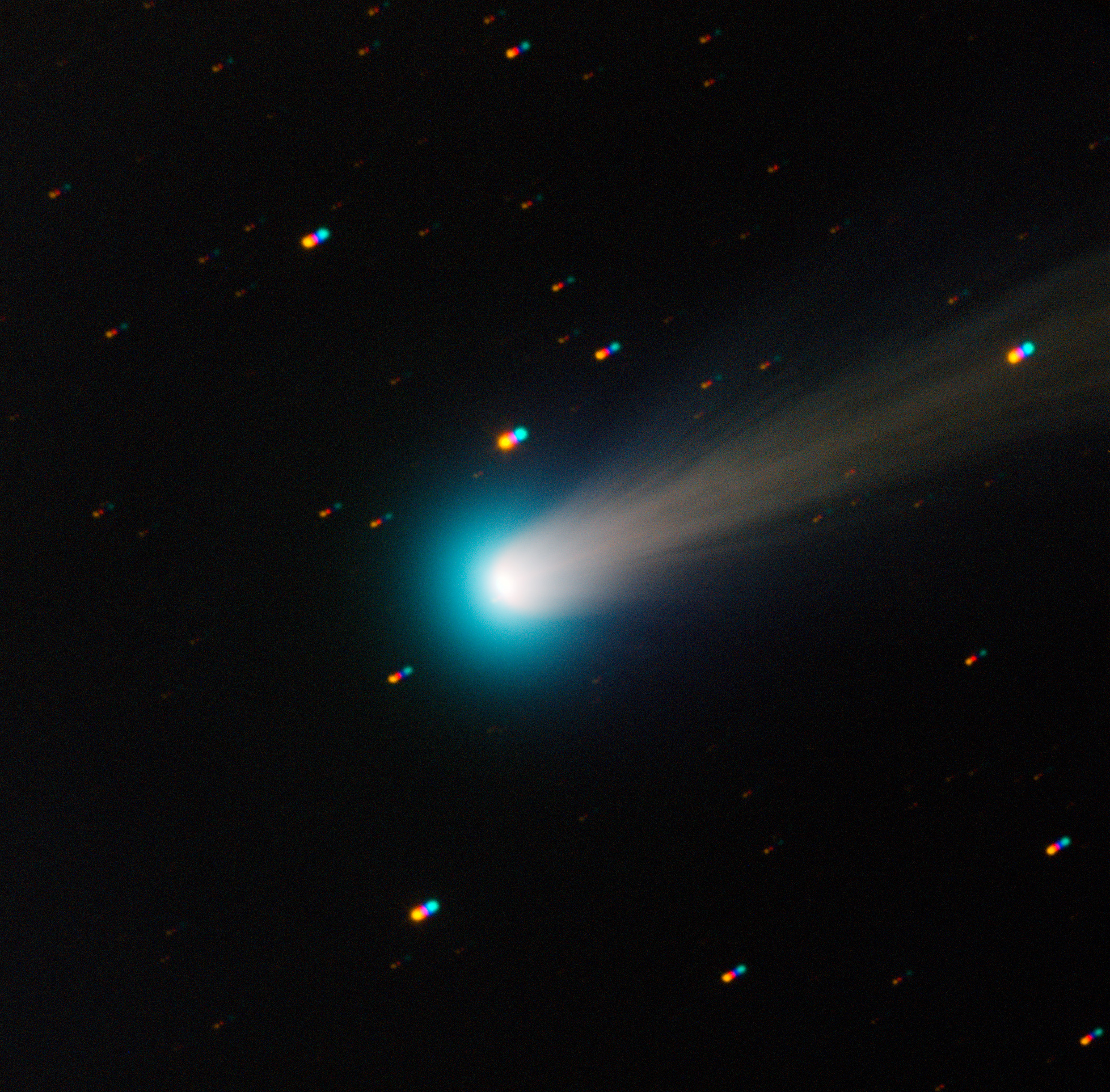
- Comet ISON as captured by TRAPPIST on 15 November 2013

Discovery
- Discovered by: Vitaly Nevsky; Artyom Novichonok
- Discovery site: ISON–Kislovodsk (D00)
- Discovery date: 21 September 2012

Orbital characteristics
- Epoch: 14 December 2013 (JD 2456640.5)
- Observation arc: 2.15 years
- Number of observations: 6,682
- Orbit type: Oort cloud
- Perihelion: 0.01244 AU (2.68 R_{☉})
- Eccentricity: 1.000000086 (epoch 1950); 0.9999947 (near perihelion); 1.0002 (epoch 2050)
- Orbital period: Ejection trajectory (epoch 2050)
- Max. orbital speed: 337.3 km/s (755,000 mph; 1.214 million km/h; 209.6 mi/s)
- Inclination: 62.4°
- Last perihelion: 28 November 2013

Physical characteristics
- Dimensions: 0.6–1.4 km (0.37–0.87 mi)
- Mean density: 460±80 kg/m^{3}
- Comet total magnitude (M1): 10.2
- Apparent magnitude: –2.0 (2013 apparition)

Comet ISON, formally known as C/2012 S1, was a sungrazing comet from the Oort cloud which was discovered on 21 September 2012 by Vitaly Nevsky (Віталь Неўскі, Vitebsk, Belarus) and Artyom Novichonok (Артём Новичонок, Kondopoga, Russia).

== History ==
The discovery was made using the 0.4-meter (16 in) reflector of the International Scientific Optical Network (ISON) near Kislovodsk, Russia. Data processing was carried out by automated asteroid-discovery program CoLiTec. Precovery images by the Mount Lemmon Survey from 28 December 2011 and by Pan-STARRS from 28 January 2012 were quickly located.

Follow-up observations were made on 22 September 2012 by a team from Remanzacco Observatory in Italy using the iTelescope network. The discovery was announced by the Minor Planet Center on 24 September.

Observations by Swift in January 2013 suggested that Comet ISON's nucleus was around 5 kilometers (3 mi) in diameter. Later estimates were that the nucleus was only about 2 kilometers (1 mi) in diameter. Mars Reconnaissance Orbiter (MRO) observations suggested the nucleus was smaller than 0.8 kilometers (0.5 mi) in diameter.

Shortly after Comet ISON's discovery, the media reported that it might become brighter than the full Moon. However, as events transpired, it never became bright enough to be readily visible to the naked eye. Furthermore, it broke apart as it passed close to the Sun. Reports on 28 November 2013 (the day of perihelion passage) indicated that Comet ISON had partially or completely disintegrated due to the Sun's heat and tidal forces. However, later that day CIOC (NASA Comet ISON Observing Campaign) members discovered a coma-like feature, suggesting a small fragment of it may have survived perihelion.

On 29 November 2013, the coma dimmed to an apparent magnitude of 5. By the end of 30 November 2013, the coma had further faded to below naked-eye visibility at magnitude 7. On 1 December 2013, the coma continued to fade even further as it finished traversing the Solar and Heliospheric Observatory's view. On 2 December 2013, the CIOC announced that Comet ISON had fully disintegrated. The Hubble Space Telescope failed to detect fragments of ISON on 18 December 2013.

On 8 May 2014, a detailed examination of the disintegration was published, suggesting that the comet had fully disintegrated hours before perihelion.

== Discovery ==
During routine observations on 21 November 2012, Vitali Nevski and Artyom Novichonok monitored areas of Gemini and Cancer after their observations were delayed by clouded weather for much of the night. The team used ISON's 0.4-meter (16 in) reflector near Kislovodsk, Russia, and CCD imaging to carry out their observations. Shortly after their session, Nevski processed data using CoLiTec, an automated asteroid discovery software program. In analysis he noted an unusually bright object with slow apparent movement, indicating a position outside the orbit of Jupiter based on the use of four 100-second CCD exposures. At the time of discovery, the object's apparent magnitude ranged from 19.1 to as bright as 18.8. (Note: Astronomical magnitudes decrease as brightness increases, from large positive values, through zero, to negative values for very bright objects.)

The group reported their discovery to the Central Bureau for Astronomical Telegrams as an asteroidal object, which was subsequently forwarded to the Minor Planet Center. However, the group later reported that the object had a cometary appearance with a coma approximately 8 arcseconds across. The object's position and cometary appearance was confirmed by several other unaffiliated observers, and as such the comet was named ISON, after the international observational project and in accordance with International Astronomical Union naming guidelines. Comet ISON was precovered in analysis of Mount Lemmon Observatory imagery by Gareth V. Williams and Pan-STARRS imagery in Haleakalā. Precovery images from Mount Lemmon were first taken on 28 December 2011 and indicated that the comet had an estimated apparent magnitude ranging from 19.5 to 19.9. Images from Pan-STARRS were taken on 28 January 2012 and in those images the comet had an estimated apparent magnitude ranging from 19.8 to 20.6.

== Orbit ==
Comet ISON came to perihelion (closest approach to the Sun) on 28 November 2013 at a distance of 0.0124 AU (1,860,000 km; 1,150,000 mi) from the center point of the Sun. Accounting for the solar radius of 695,500 km (432,200 mi), Comet ISON passed approximately 1,165,000 km (724,000 mi) above the Sun's surface. Its trajectory appeared to be hyperbolic, which suggested that it was a dynamically new comet that took millions of years coming freshly from the Oort cloud or even a candidate interstellar comet. (Note: C/2012 S1 (ISON) had an epoch 1600 barycentric semi-major axis of −145127 and would have an inbound v_infinite of 0.2 km/s at 50000 au: v = 42.1219√1/(distance of 50000) − 0.5/(semi-major axis of −145127)) Near perihelion, generic heliocentric two-body solutions to the orbital eccentricity suggested that the comet could be either bound or unbound to the Sun. But for objects at such high eccentricity, the Solar System's barycenter is more stable than a heliocentric solution. The orbit of a long-period comet is properly obtained when the osculating orbit is computed at an epoch after leaving the planetary region and is calculated with respect to the center of mass of the Solar System. JPL Horizons barycentric orbital elements for epoch 1950 and 2050 both generate a hyperbolic solution with no orbital period. Using an epoch of 1950, the inbound weakly hyperbolic eccentricity of 1.000000086 suggests ISON is of solar origin. On its closest approach, Comet ISON passed about 0.07248 AU (10.843 million km; 6.737 million mi) from Mars on 1 October 2013, and the remnants of Comet ISON passed about 0.43 AU (64 million km; 40 million mi) from Earth on 26 December 2013.

Shortly after its discovery, similarities between the orbital elements of Comet ISON and the Great Comet of 1680 led to speculation that there might be a connection between them. Further observations of ISON, however, showed that the two comets are not related.

When Earth passed near the orbit of Comet ISON on 14–15 January 2014, it was predicted that micron-sized dust particles blown by the Sun's radiation might cause a meteor shower or noctilucent clouds; however, both events were considered unlikely. Because Earth only passed near Comet ISON's orbit, not through the tail, the chances that a meteor shower would occur were slim. In addition, meteor showers from long-period comets that make just one pass into the inner solar system are very rare, if ever recorded. The possibility that small particles left behind on the orbital path—almost one hundred days after the nucleus has passed—could form noctilucent clouds is also slim. No such events are known to have taken place in the past under similar circumstances.

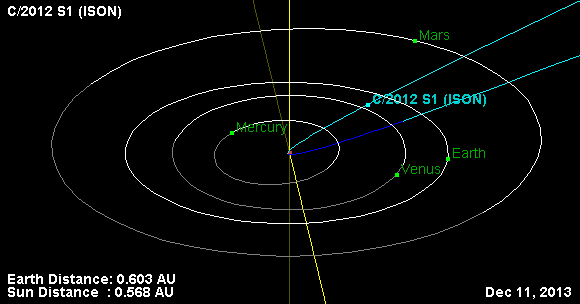
Position of comet remnants on 11 December 2013

Visualization of the orbit of comet ISON as it moved into the inner Solar System in 2013

== Brightness, observations, and visibility ==
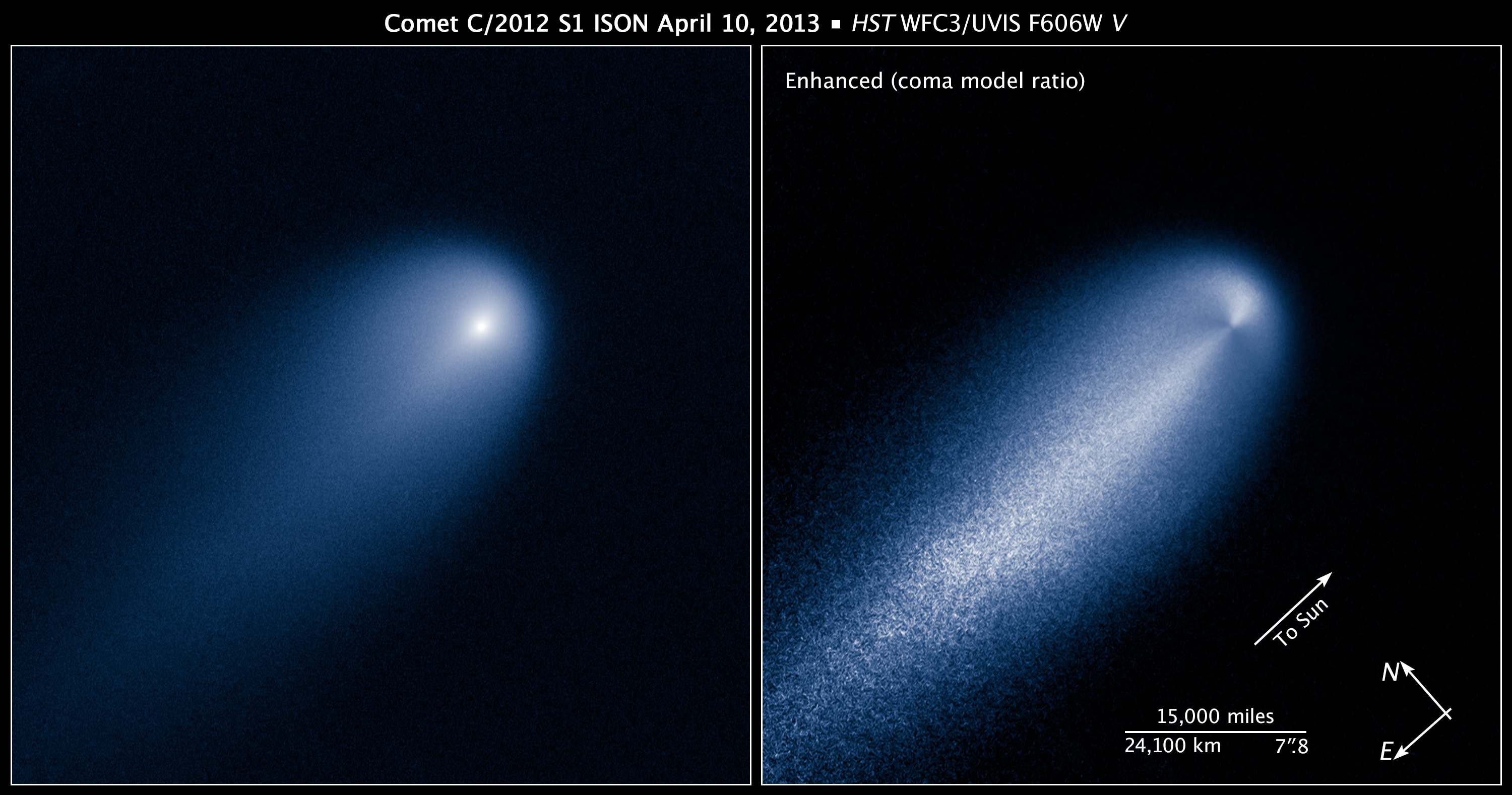
Comet ISON, imaged by the Hubble Space Telescope on 10 April 2013—near Jupiter's orbit; also, enhanced (coma model ratio) version

=== Discovery while entering inner Solar System ===
At the time of its discovery, Comet ISON's brightness was approximately apparent magnitude 18.8, far too dim to be seen with the naked eye, but bright enough to be imaged by amateurs with large telescopes. It then followed the pattern of most comets and increased gradually in brightness on approach to the Sun.

At least a dozen spacecraft imaged Comet ISON. It was first imaged by the Swift and Deep Impact spacecraft in January and February 2013, and shown to be active with an extended tail. In April and May 2013 the Hubble Space Telescope (HST) measured Comet ISON's size, and the color, extent, and polarization of its emitted dust. The Spitzer Space Telescope (SST) observed Comet ISON on 13 June and estimated carbon dioxide outgassing at about 1 million kilograms (2.2 million pounds) per day. From 5 June to 29 August 2013, Comet ISON had an elongation less than 30° from the Sun. No obvious rotational variability was detected by either Deep Impact, HST, or Spitzer. Amateur astronomer Bruce Gary recovered it on 12 August 2013 when it was 6° above the horizon and 19° from the Sun. Due to it brightening more slowly than predicted, Comet ISON only became visible through small telescopes during early October 2013.

=== Lead-up to perihelion ===
On 28 September 2013, NASA launched BRRISON, a stratospheric science balloon carrying a 0.8 m (31 in) telescope and science instruments designed to capture images and data on Comet ISON from an altitude of 37 km (23 mi). However, about two and a half hours after launch, the telescope returned to its stowed position too quickly, driving it past a stow latch. Operators were unable to redeploy the telescope, resulting in mission failure.

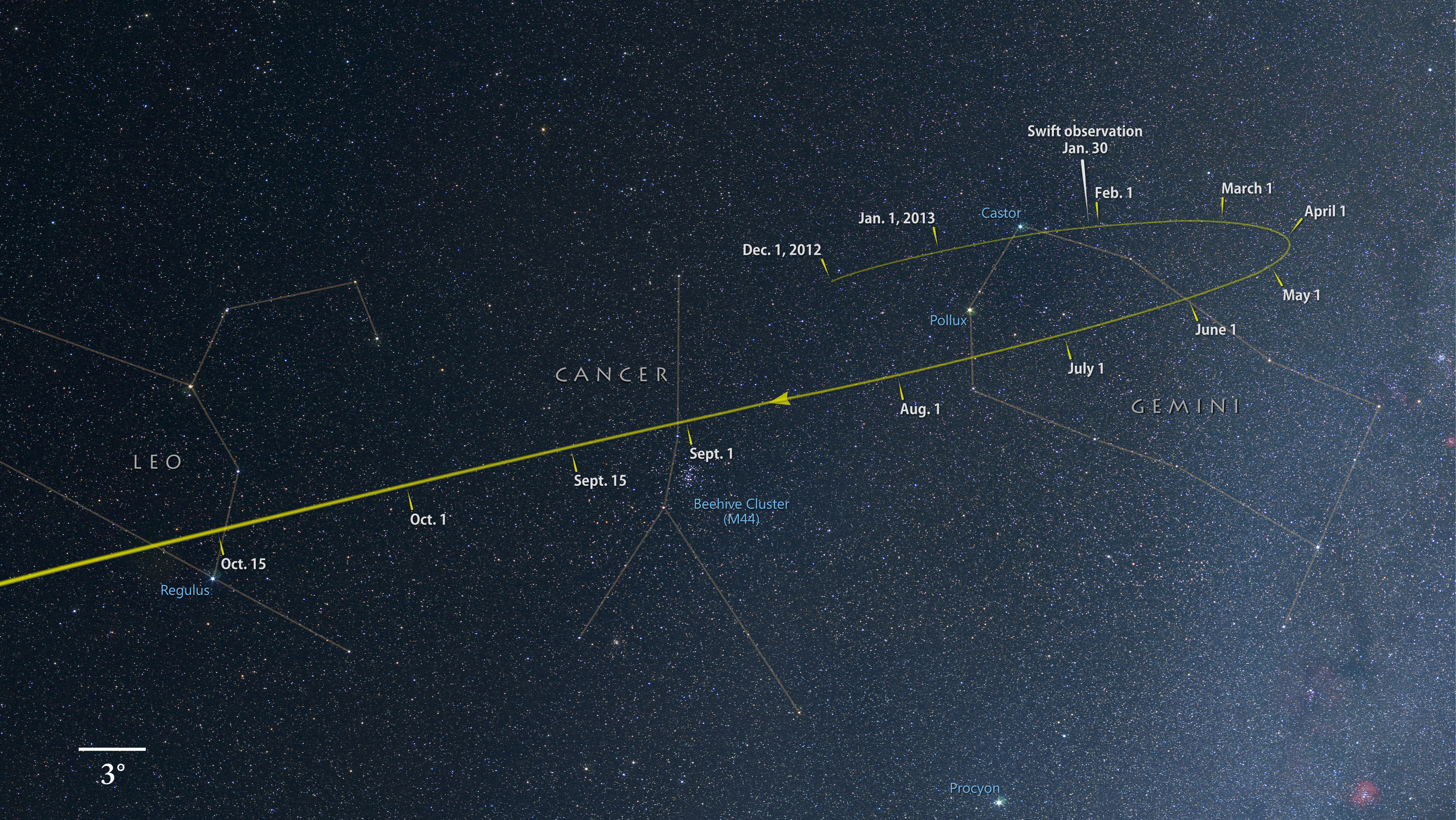
The path of Comet ISON from December 2012 through October 2013 as it passed through Gemini, Cancer, and Leo

On 1 October 2013, Comet ISON passed within 0.07 AU (10 million km; 6.5 million mi) of Mars. Between 29 September and 2 October, the Mars Reconnaissance Orbiter (MRO) detected Comet ISON. The twin STEREO spacecraft began detecting Comet ISON in the second week of October. October 2013 images of Comet ISON displayed a greenish tint, probably attributable to the release of cyanogen and diatomic carbon. On 31 October 2013, Comet ISON was detected with 10×50 mm binoculars.

On 14 November 2013, Comet ISON was reported to be visible to the naked eye by experienced observers located at dark sites. It had an appearance similar to comet C/2013 R1 that was also visible to the naked eye. Comet ISON was not expected to reach the naked-eye magnitude 6 until mid-November, and was not expected to be observable by the general public until it brightened to about magnitude 4. On 17–18 November, when Comet ISON was brighter and much closer to the morning twilight, it passed the bright star Spica in the constellation Virgo. But due to the full Moon and glow of twilight, Comet ISON had not become bright enough to be seen without optical aid by the general public. On 22 November, it started to drop below Mercury in the bright twilight.

=== Perihelion ===
SOHO started to view it on 27 November, first with the LASCO coronograph. On 27 November ISON brightened to magnitude −2 and passed Delta Scorpii.

Around the time it reached perihelion on 28 November 2013, it might have become extremely bright if it had remained fully intact. However, predicting the brightness of a comet is difficult, especially one that passes so close to the Sun and is affected by the forward scattering of light. Originally, media sources predicted that it might become brighter than the full Moon, but based on more recent observations, it was only expected to reach around apparent magnitude −3 to −5, about the same brightness as Venus. In comparison, the brightest comet since 1935 was Comet Ikeya–Seki in 1965 at magnitude −10, which was much brighter than Venus.

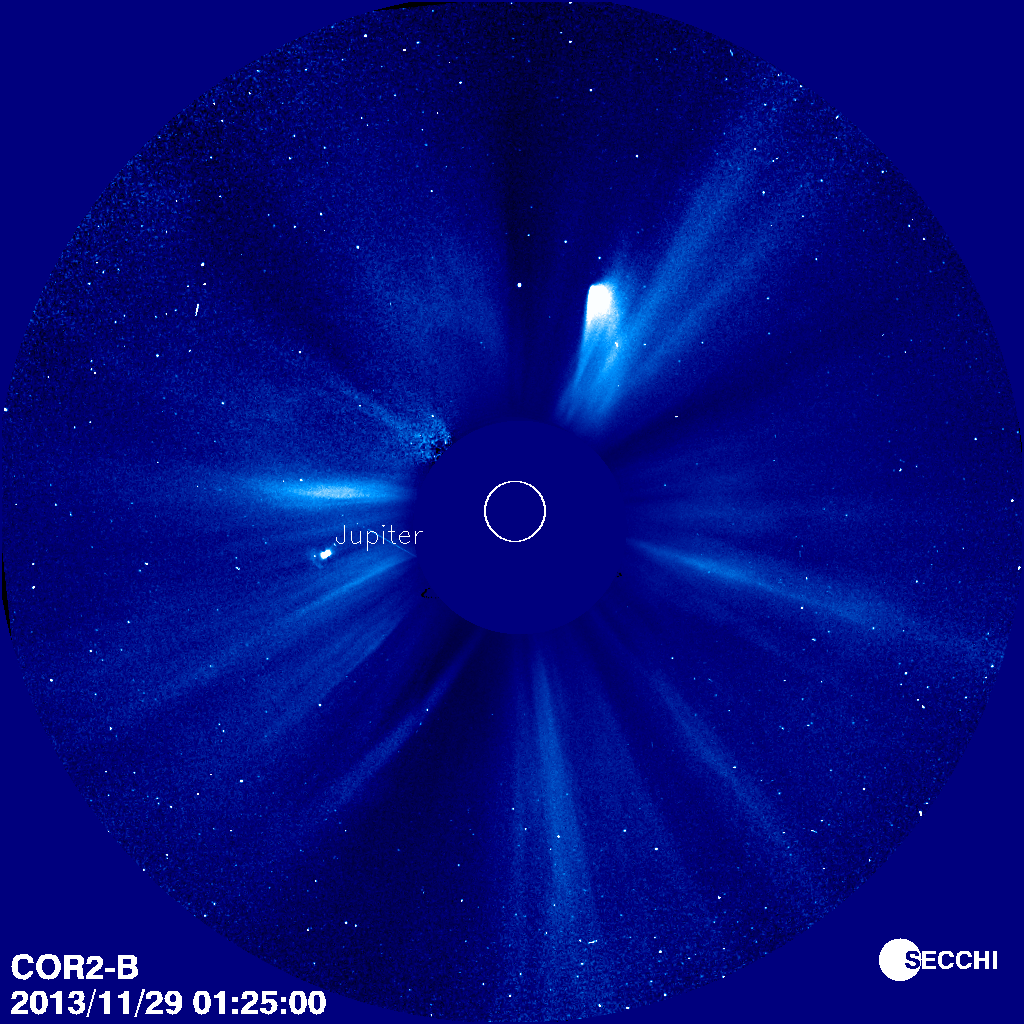
STEREO-B COR2 image of Comet ISON re-emerging ~7 hours after perihelion

On 29 November 2013, Comet ISON had dimmed to magnitude 5 in the LASCO images. By the end of 30 November 2013, it had further faded below naked-eye visibility at magnitude 7.

=== After perihelion ===
In a February 2013 study, 1,897 observations were used to create a light curve. The resulting plot showed Comet ISON increasing its brightness relatively quickly at R^{+4.35}. If this had continued to perihelion, it would have reached magnitude −17 – brighter than the full Moon. It had since exhibited a "slowdown event", however, similar to behavior exhibited by other Oort cloud comets, among them C/2011 L4. Therefore, Comet ISON's brightness increased less quickly than expected and it did not become as bright as some early predictions.

Further observations suggested that, even if it had remained intact, it might only brighten to about magnitude −6. The temperature at perihelion had been calculated to reach 2,700 °C (4,890 °F) – sufficient to melt iron. Additionally, it passed within its Roche limit, meaning it might disintegrate due to the Sun's gravity.

Comet ISON had been expected to be brightest around the time it was closest to the Sun, if it could have been seen; but because it was less than 1° from the Sun at its closest, it would have been difficult to see against the Sun's glare. If it had survived its perihelion passage intact, Comet ISON should have been well-placed for observers in the northern hemisphere during mid to late December 2013. It might even have remained visible to the naked eye until January 2014. As Comet ISON moved north on the celestial sphere it would have passed within 2° of Polaris on 8 January.

== Science results ==
On 22 May 2014, the Eurasian Astronomical Society and Sternberg Astronomical Institute published preliminary results of observations of the observed meteor shower of Comet ISON from January 2014. Scientists from Ukraine and Belarus were assisted by meteor observation groups around the world. The results confirmed that particles of Comet ISON, which likely sublimated at perihelion, entered Earth's atmosphere as meteor particles. 43 meteor events were recorded after analyzing 54,000 images from 10–17 January 2014.

On 11 August 2014, astronomers released studies, using the Atacama Large Millimeter Array (ALMA) for the first time, that detailed the distribution of HCN, HNC, H_{2}CO, and dust inside the comae of comets C/2012 F6 (Lemmon) and C/2012 S1 (ISON).

== Name ==
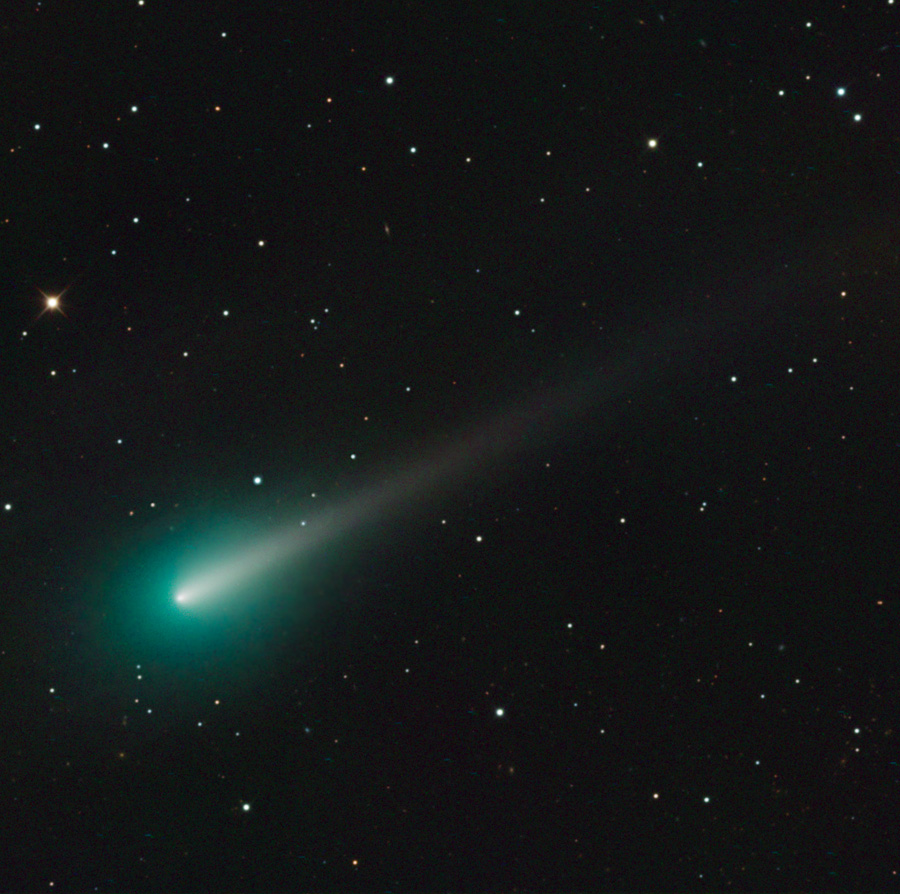
Comet ISON seen from the Mount Lemmon SkyCenter on 8 October 2013, as it passed through the constellation of Leo

Comet ISON's formal designation was C/2012 S1. (Note: The "C" indicates that it was non-periodic, followed by the year of discovery. The "S" represents the half-month of discovery – in the case of C/2012 S1, the second half of September – and the number "1" shows that this was the first comet found in that half-month.) It was named "ISON" after the organization where its discovery was made, the Russia-based International Scientific Optical Network. The initial report of the object to the Central Bureau for Astronomical Telegrams identified the object as an asteroid, and it was listed on the Near-Earth Object Confirmation Page. Follow-up observations by independent teams were the first to report cometary features. Therefore, under the International Astronomical Union's comet-naming guidelines, Comet ISON was named after the team that discovered it, rather than the individual discoverers.

== Media coverage ==
After it was discovered in 2012, some media sources called Comet ISON the "Comet of the Century" and speculated that it might outshine the full Moon. An Astronomy Now columnist wrote in September 2012 that "if predictions hold true then Comet ISON will certainly be one of the greatest comets in human history."

Astronomer Karl Battams criticized the media's suggestion that Comet ISON would be "brighter than the full Moon", saying that members of the Comet ISON Observing Campaign did not foresee ISON becoming that bright.

Comet ISON has been compared to Comet Kohoutek, seen in 1973–1974, another highly anticipated Oort Cloud comet that peaked early and fizzled out.
