= Protonated hydrogen cyanide =

Chemical compound

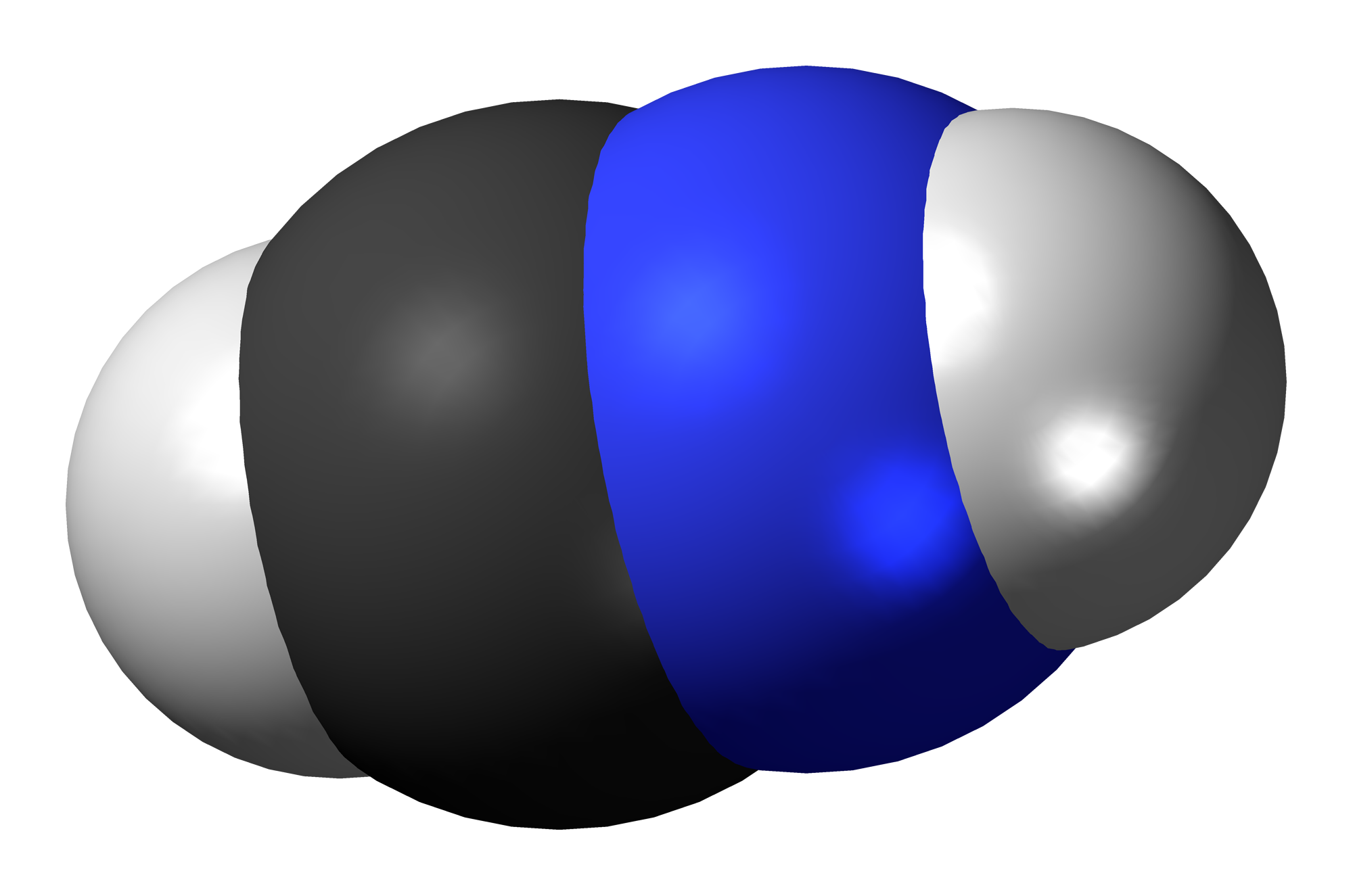

Names
- IUPAC names Methylidyneammonium, Methylidyneazanium
- Systematic IUPAC name Methylidyneammonium
- Other names Methanimine, iminomethylcation; 1-azoniaethyne; iminomethylium

Identifiers
CAS Number	38263-97-7
3D model (JSmol)	linear form (HC≡N^{+}H): Interactive image; HC^{+}=NH: Interactive image; CNH^{+}_{2}: Interactive image; H_{2}CN^{+}: Interactive image; cis-HCNH^{+}: Interactive image; trans-HCNH^{+}: Interactive image
ChemSpider	10446358 linear form (HC≡N^{+}H); 18948137 HC^{+}=NH
PubChem CID	22952220 linear form (HC≡N^{+}H); 274441977
- InChI: InChI=1S/CHN/c1-2/h1H/p+1 Key: LELOWRISYMNNSU-UHFFFAOYSA-O; linear form (HC≡N^{+}H): InChI=1S/CHN/c1-2/h1H/p+1 Key: LELOWRISYMNNSU-UHFFFAOYSA-O; HC^{+}=NH: InChI=1S/CH3N/c1-2/h2H,1H2/q+1 Key: WFXDWMNZLVWETL-UHFFFAOYSA-N
- SMILES: linear form (HC≡N^{+}H): C#[NH+]; HC^{+}=NH: [CH+]=N; CNH^{+}_{2}: [CH0]=[NH2+]; H_{2}CN^{+}: C=[NH0+]; cis-HCNH^{+}: [H]/[C]=[N+]\[H]; trans-HCNH^{+}: [H]/[C]=[N+]/[H]

Properties
Chemical formula	CH_{2}N^{+1}
Molar mass	28.033 g·mol^{−1}
Conjugate base	Hydrogen cyanide; Hydrogen isocyanide

Structure
Point group	C_{∞v} (linear form (HC≡N^{+}H))
Molecular shape	linear: HC≡N^{+}H

Related compounds
Related isoelectronic	ethyne
- Except where otherwise noted, data are given for materials in their standard state (at 25 °C [77 °F], 100 kPa). Infobox references

HCNH^{+}, also known as protonated hydrogen cyanide, is a molecular ion of astrophysical interest. It also exists in the condensed state when formed by superacids.

== Structure ==
In the ground state, HCH is a simple linear molecule, whereas its excited triplet state is expected to have cis and trans isomeric forms. The higher-energy structural isomers H_{2}CN^{+} and CH_{2} have also been studied theoretically.

== Laboratory studies ==
As a relatively simple molecular ion, HCNH^{+} has been extensively studied in the laboratory. The very first spectrum taken at any wavelength focused on the ν_{2} (C−H stretch) ro-vibrational band in the infrared. Soon afterward, the same authors reported on their investigation of the ν_{1} (N−H stretch) band. Following these initial studies, several groups published manuscripts on the various ro-vibrational spectra of HCNH^{+}, including studies of the ν_{3} band (C≡N stretch), the ν_{4} band (H−C≡N bend), and the ν_{5} band (H−N≡C bend) .

While all of these studies focused on ro-vibrational spectra in the infrared, it was not until 1998 that technology advanced far enough for an investigation of the pure rotational spectrum of HCNH^{+} in the microwave region to take place. At that time, microwave spectra for HCNH^{+} and its isotopomers HCND^{+} and DCND^{+} were published. Recently, the pure rotational spectrum of HCNH^{+} was measured again in order to more precisely determine the molecular rotational constants B and D.

== Formation and destruction ==
According to the database at astrochemistry.net, the most advanced chemical models of HCNH^{+} include 71 total formation reactions and 21 total destruction reactions. Of these, however, only a handful dominate the overall formation and destruction. In the case of formation, the 7 dominant reactions are:

H^{+}_{3} + HCN → HCNH^{+} + H_{2}
H^{+}_{3} + HNC → HCNH^{+} + H_{2}
HCO^{+} + HCN → HCNH^{+} + CO
HCO^{+} + HNC → HCNH^{+} + CO
H_{3}O^{+} + HCN → HCNH^{+} + H_{2}O
H_{3}O^{+} + HNC → HCNH^{+} + H_{2}O
C^{+} + NH_{3} → HCNH^{+} + H

== Astronomical detections ==
=== Initial interstellar detection ===
HCNH^{+} was first detected in interstellar space in 1986 toward the dense cloud Sgr B2 using the NRAO 12 m dish and the Texas Millimeter Wave Observatory. These observations utilized the J = 1–0, 2–1, and 3–2 pure rotational transitions at 74, 148, and 222 GHz, respectively.

=== Subsequent interstellar detections ===
Since the initial detection, HCNH^{+} has also been observed in TMC-1 as well as DR 21(OH) . The initial detection toward Sgr B2 has also been confirmed. All 3 of these sources are dense molecular clouds, and to date HCNH^{+} has not been detected in diffuse interstellar material.

=== Solar System bodies ===
While not directly detected via spectroscopy, the existence of HCNH^{+} has been inferred to exist in the atmosphere of Saturn's largest moon, Titan, based on data from the Ion and Neutral Mass Spectrometer (INMS) instrument aboard the Cassini space probe. Models of Titan's atmosphere had predicted that HCNH^{+} would be the dominant ion present, and a strong peak in the mass spectrum at m/z = 28 seems to support this theory.

In 1997, observations were made of the long-period comet Hale–Bopp in an attempt to find HCNH^{+}, but it was not detected. However, the upper limit derived from these observations, along with the detections of HCN, HNC, and CN, is important in understanding the chemistry associated with comets.
