= Hydrogen cyanide =

Ball and stick model of hydrogen cyanide
Spacefill model of hydrogen cyanide
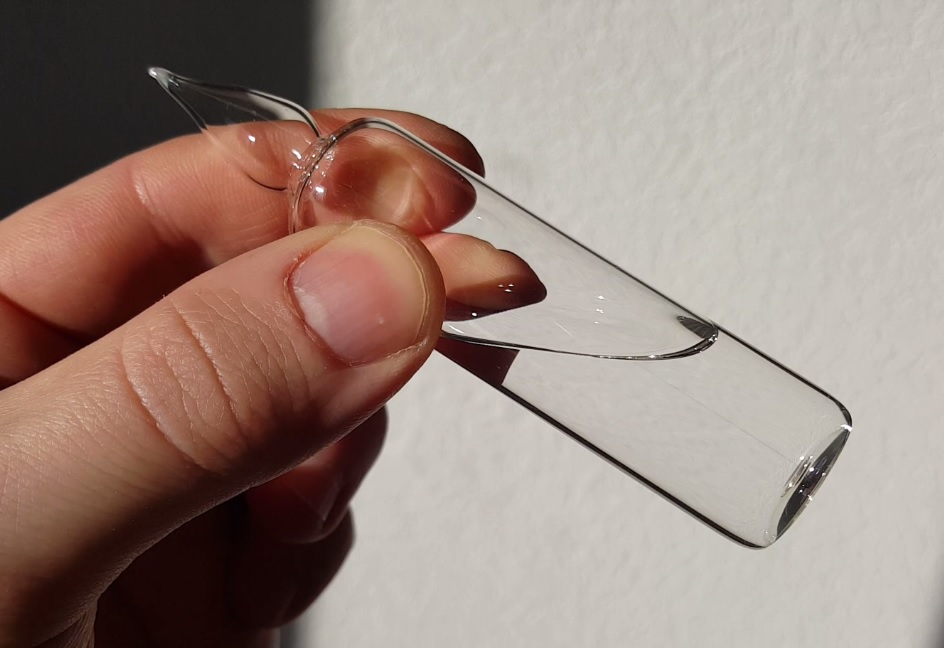

Names
- IUPAC name Formonitrile
- Systematic IUPAC name Methanenitrile
- Other names: Formic anammonide; Hydridonitridocarbon; Hydrocyanic acid (aqueous); Prussic acid; Cyanane

Identifiers
CAS Number	74-90-8
3D model (JSmol)	Interactive image
ChEBI	CHEBI:18407
ChemSpider	748
ECHA InfoCard	100.000.747
EC Number	200-821-6
KEGG	C01326
MeSH	Hydrogen+Cyanide
PubChem CID	768
RTECS number	MW6825000
UNII	2WTB3V159F
UN number	1051
CompTox Dashboard (EPA)	DTXSID9024148
- InChI: InChI=1S/CHN/c1-2/h1H Key: LELOWRISYMNNSU-UHFFFAOYSA-N
- SMILES: C#N

Properties
Chemical formula	HCN
Molar mass	27.0253 g/mol
Appearance	Colorless liquid or gas
Odor	bitter almond-like
Density	0.6876 g/cm^{3}
Melting point	−13.29 °C (8.08 °F; 259.86 K)
Boiling point	26 °C (79 °F; 299 K)
Solubility in water	Miscible
Solubility in ethanol	Miscible
Vapor pressure	100 kPa (25 °C)
Henry's law constant (k_{H})	75 μmol Pa^{−1} kg^{−1}
Acidity (pK_{a})	9.21 (in water), 12.9 (in DMSO)
Basicity (pK_{b})	4.79 (cyanide anion)
Conjugate acid	Hydrocyanonium
Conjugate base	Cyanide
Refractive index (n_{D})	1.2675
Viscosity	0.183 mPa·s (25 °C)

Structure
Crystal structure	tetragonal (>170 K) orthorhombic (<170 K)
Point group	C_{∞v}
Molecular shape	Linear
Dipole moment	2.98 D

Thermochemistry
Heat capacity (C)	35.9 J K^{−1} mol^{−1} (gas)
Std molar entropy (S^{⦵}_{298})	201.8 J K^{−1} mol^{−1}
Std enthalpy of formation (Δ_{f}H^{⦵}_{298})	135.1 kJ mol^{−1}

Hazards
- GHS labelling
Pictograms	(GHS02: Flammable) (GHS06: Toxic) (GHS08: Health hazard) (GHS09: Environmental hazard)
Signal word	Danger
Hazard statements	H220, H224, H300+H310+H330, H319, H336, H370, H410
Precautionary statements	P210, P261, P305+P351+P338
NFPA 704 (fire diamond)	4 4 2
Flash point	−17.8 °C (0.0 °F; 255.3 K)
Autoignition temperature	538 °C (1,000 °F; 811 K)
Explosive limits	5.6% – 40.0%
- Lethal dose or concentration (LD, LC)
LC_{50} (median concentration)	501 ppm (rat, 5 min); 323 ppm (mouse, 5 min); 275 ppm (rat, 15 min); 170 ppm (rat, 30 min); 160 ppm (rat, 30 min); 323 ppm (rat, 5 min)
LC_{Lo} (lowest published)	200 ppm (mammal, 5 min); 36 ppm (mammal, 2 hr); 107 ppm (human, 10 min); 759 ppm (rabbit, 1 min); 759 ppm (cat, 1 min); 357 ppm (human, 2 min); 179 ppm (human, 1 hr)
- NIOSH (US health exposure limits)
PEL (Permissible)	TWA 10 ppm (11 mg/m^{3}) [skin]
REL (Recommended)	ST 4.7 ppm (5 mg/m^{3}) [skin]
IDLH (Immediate danger)	50 ppm

Related compounds
Related alkanenitriles	Hydrogen isocyanide; Isocyanic acid; Thiocyanic acid; Cyanogen iodide; Cyanogen bromide; Cyanogen chloride; Cyanogen fluoride; Acetonitrile; Aminoacetonitrile; Glycolonitrile; Cyanogen
- Except where otherwise noted, data are given for materials in their standard state (at 25 °C [77 °F], 100 kPa). verify (what is ?) Infobox references

Hydrogen cyanide (also called prussic acid) is a chemical compound with the formula HCN and structural formula H−C≡N. It is a highly toxic and flammable liquid that boils slightly above room temperature, at 25.6 °C (78.1 °F). HCN is produced on an industrial scale and is a highly valued precursor to many chemical compounds ranging from polymers to pharmaceuticals. Large-scale applications are for the production of potassium cyanide and adiponitrile, used in mining and plastics, respectively. It is more toxic than solid cyanide compounds due to its volatile nature. A solution of hydrogen cyanide in water, represented as HCN(aq), is called hydrocyanic acid. The salts of the cyanide anion are known as cyanides.

Whether hydrogen cyanide is an organic compound or not is a topic of debate among chemists. It is traditionally considered inorganic, but can also be considered a nitrile, giving rise to its alternative names of methanenitrile and formonitrile.

== Structure and general properties ==
Hydrogen cyanide is a linear molecule, with a triple bond between carbon and nitrogen. The C-N bond length is 115 picometers. The isomer of HCN is HNC, hydrogen isocyanide.

=== Odor ===
About half of people are unable to detect the odor of hydrogen cyanide owing to a recessive genetic trait. For those that can detect it, the odor has been described as bitter almond-like.

== Chemical properties ==
Hydrogen cyanide is weakly acidic with a pK_{a} of 9.2. It partially ionizes in water to give the cyanide anion, CN^{−}. HCN forms hydrogen bonds with its conjugate base, species such as (CN^{−})(HCN)_{n}.

In one of its principal uses, HCN reacts with alkenes to give nitriles. The conversion, which is called hydrocyanation, employs nickel complexes as catalysts.

RCH=CH_{2} + HCN → RCH_{2}−CH_{2}CN

HCN is unstable with respect to self-condensation. Four molecules of HCN will tetramerize into diaminomaleonitrile. This and similar reactions have attracted attention with regard to their possible relevance to the origin of life.

Metal cyanides are typically prepared by salt metathesis from alkali metal cyanide salts, but mercuric cyanide is formed from aqueous hydrogen cyanide:

HgO + 2 HCN → Hg(CN)_{2} + H_{2}O

== History of discovery and naming ==
Hydrogen cyanide was first isolated in 1752 by French chemist Pierre Macquer who converted Prussian blue to an iron oxide plus a volatile component and found that these could be used to reconstitute it. The new component was what is now known as hydrogen cyanide. It was subsequently prepared from Prussian blue by the Swedish chemist Carl Wilhelm Scheele in 1782, and was eventually given the German name Blausäure (lit. 'Blue acid') because of its acidic nature in water and its derivation from Prussian blue. In English, it became known popularly as prussic acid.

In 1787, the French chemist Claude Louis Berthollet showed that prussic acid did not contain oxygen, an important contribution to acid theory, which had hitherto postulated that acids must contain oxygen (hence the name of oxygen itself, which is derived from Greek elements that mean "acid-former" and are likewise calqued into German as Sauerstoff and into Slavic languages, such as kyslík into Czech, or кислород into Russian).

In 1811, Joseph Louis Gay-Lussac prepared pure, liquified hydrogen cyanide, and in 1815 he deduced prussic acid's chemical formula.

=== Etymology ===
The word cyanide for the radical in hydrogen cyanide was derived from its French equivalent, cyanure, which Gay-Lussac constructed from the Ancient Greek word κύανος for dark blue enamel or lapis lazuli, again owing to the chemical’s derivation from Prussian blue. This Greek word is also the root of the English color name cyan.

== Production and synthesis ==
The most important process is the Andrussow oxidation invented by Leonid Andrussow at IG Farben in which methane and ammonia react in the presence of oxygen at about 1,200 °C (2,190 °F) over a platinum catalyst:

2 CH_{4} + 2 NH_{3} + 3 O_{2} → 2 HCN + 6 H_{2}O

In 2006, between 500 million and 1 billion pounds (between 230,000 and 450,000 t) were produced in the US. Hydrogen cyanide is produced in large quantities by several processes and is a recovered waste product from the manufacture of acrylonitrile.

Of lesser importance is the Degussa process (BMA process) in which no oxygen is added and the energy must be transferred indirectly through the reactor wall:

CH_{4} + NH_{3} → HCN + 3 H_{2}

This reaction is akin to steam reforming, the reaction of methane and water to give carbon monoxide and hydrogen.

In the Shawinigan Process, hydrocarbons, e.g. propane, are reacted with ammonia.

In the laboratory, small amounts of HCN are produced by the addition of acids to cyanide salts of alkali metals:

H^{+} + NaCN → HCN + Na^{+}

This reaction is sometimes the basis of accidental poisonings because the acid converts a nonvolatile cyanide salt into the gaseous HCN.

Hydrogen cyanide could be obtained from potassium ferricyanide and acid:

6 H^{+} + [Fe(CN)_{6}]^{3−} → 6 HCN + Fe^{3+}

=== Historical methods of production ===
The large demand for cyanides for mining operations in the 1890s was met by George Thomas Beilby, who patented a method to produce hydrogen cyanide by passing ammonia over glowing coal in 1892. This method was used until Hamilton Castner in 1894 developed a synthesis starting from coal, ammonia, and sodium yielding sodium cyanide, which reacts with acid to form gaseous HCN.

== Applications ==
HCN is the precursor to sodium cyanide and potassium cyanide, which are used mainly in gold and silver mining and for the electroplating of those metals. Via the intermediacy of cyanohydrins, a variety of useful organic compounds are prepared from HCN including the monomer methyl methacrylate, from acetone, the amino acid methionine, via the Strecker synthesis, and the chelating agents EDTA and NTA. Via the hydrocyanation process, HCN is added to butadiene to give adiponitrile, a precursor to Nylon-6,6.

HCN is used globally as a fumigant against many species of pest insects that infest food production facilities. Both its efficacy and method of application lead to very small amounts of the fumigant being used compared to other toxic substances used for the same purpose. Using HCN as a fumigant also has less environmental impact, compared to some other fumigants such as sulfuryl fluoride, and methyl bromide.

== Occurrence ==
HCN is obtainable from fruits that have a pit, such as cherries, apricots, apples, and nuts such as bitter almonds, from which almond oil and extract is made. Many of these pits contain small amounts of cyanohydrins such as mandelonitrile and amygdalin, which slowly release hydrogen cyanide. One hundred grams of crushed apple seeds can yield about 70 mg of HCN. The roots of cassava plants contain cyanogenic glycosides such as linamarin, which decompose into HCN in yields of up to 370 mg per kilogram of fresh root. Some millipedes, such as Harpaphe haydeniana, Desmoxytes purpurosea, and Apheloria release hydrogen cyanide as a defense mechanism, as do certain insects, such as burnet moths and the larvae of Paropsisterna eucalyptus. Hydrogen cyanide is contained in the exhaust of vehicles, and in smoke from burning nitrogen-containing plastics.

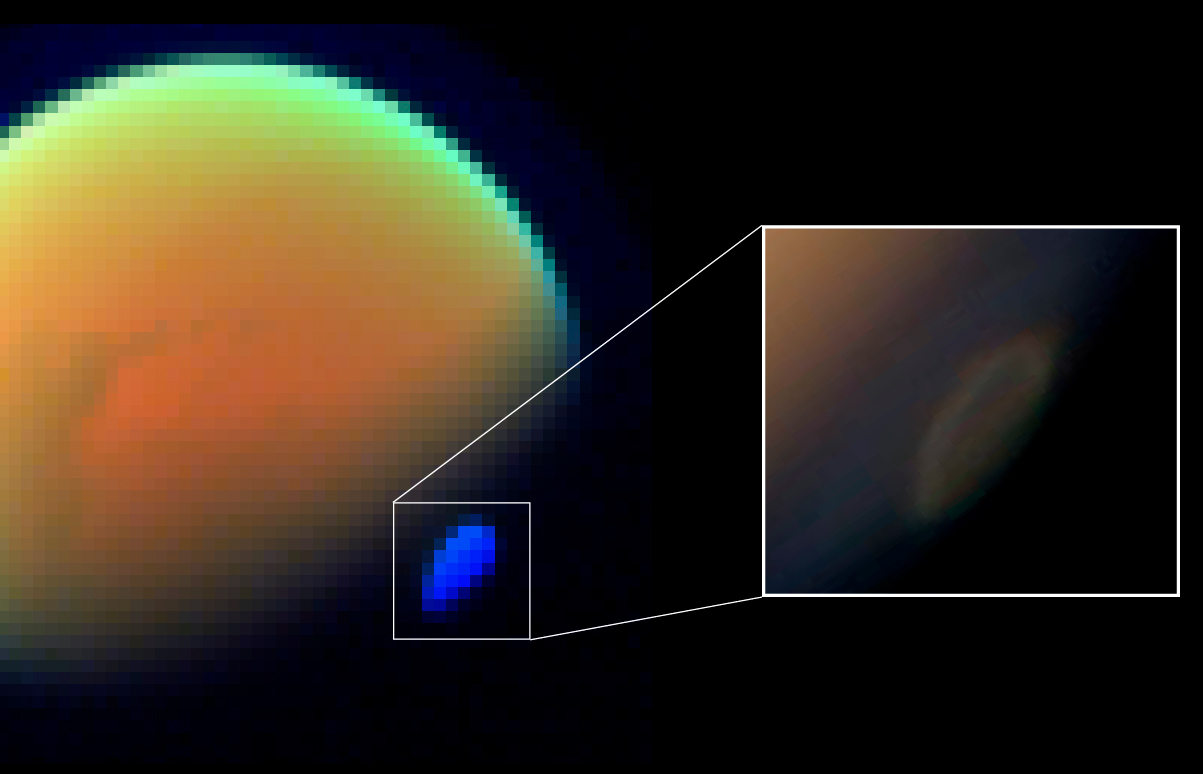
The South Pole Vortex of Saturn's moon Titan is a giant swirling cloud of HCN (November 29, 2012)

=== On Titan ===
HCN has been measured in Titan's atmosphere by four instruments on the Cassini space probe, one instrument on Voyager, and one instrument on Earth. One of these measurements was in situ, where the Cassini spacecraft dipped between 1,000 and 1,100 km (620 and 680 mi) above Titan's surface to collect atmospheric gas for mass spectrometry analysis. HCN initially forms in Titan's atmosphere through the reaction of photochemically produced methane and nitrogen radicals which proceed through the H_{2}CN intermediate, e.g., (CH_{3} + N → H_{2}CN + H → HCN + H_{2}). Ultraviolet radiation breaks HCN up into CN + H; however, CN is efficiently recycled back into HCN via the reaction CN + CH_{4} → HCN + CH_{3}.

=== On the young Earth ===
It has been postulated that carbon from a cascade of asteroids (known as the Late Heavy Bombardment), resulting from interaction of Jupiter and Saturn, blasted the surface of young Earth and reacted with nitrogen in Earth's atmosphere to form HCN.

=== In mammals ===
Some authors have shown that neurons can produce hydrogen cyanide upon activation of their opioid receptors by endogenous or exogenous opioids. They have also shown that neuronal production of HCN activates NMDA receptors and plays a role in signal transduction between neuronal cells (neurotransmission). Moreover, increased endogenous neuronal HCN production under opioids was seemingly needed for adequate opioid analgesia, as analgesic action of opioids was attenuated by HCN scavengers. They considered endogenous HCN to be a neuromodulator.

It has also been shown that, while stimulating muscarinic cholinergic receptors in cultured pheochromocytoma cells increases HCN production, in a living organism (in vivo) muscarinic cholinergic stimulation actually decreases HCN production.

Leukocytes generate HCN during phagocytosis, and can kill bacteria, fungi, and other pathogens by generating several different toxic chemicals, one of which is hydrogen cyanide.

The vasodilatation caused by sodium nitroprusside has been shown to be mediated not only by NO generation, but also by endogenous cyanide generation, which adds not only toxicity, but also some additional antihypertensive efficacy compared to nitroglycerine and other non-cyanogenic nitrates which do not cause blood cyanide levels to rise.

HCN is a constituent of tobacco smoke.

=== HCN and the origin of life ===
As a precursor to amino acids and nucleic acids, hydrogen cyanide has been proposed to have played a part in the origin of life. Compounds of special interest are oligomers of HCN including its trimer aminomalononitrile and tetramer diaminomaleonitrile, which can be described as (HCN)3 and (HCN)4, respectively. Although the relationship of these chemical reactions to the origin of life theory remains speculative, studies in this area uncovered new pathways to organic compounds derived from the condensation of HCN (e.g. adenine).

=== In space ===
Because hydrogen cyanide is a precursor to nucleic acids, which are critical for terrestrial life, astronomers are incentivized to search for derivatives of HCN.

HCN has been detected in the interstellar medium and in the atmospheres of carbon stars. Since then, extensive studies have probed formation and destruction pathways of HCN in various environments and examined its use as a tracer for a variety of astronomical species and processes. HCN can be observed from ground-based telescopes through a number of atmospheric windows. The J=1→0, J=3→2, J= 4→3, and J=10→9 pure rotational transitions have all been observed.

HCN is formed in interstellar clouds through one of two major pathways: via a neutral-neutral reaction (CH_{2} + N → HCN + H) and via dissociative recombination (HCNH^{+} + e^{−} → HCN + H). The dissociative recombination pathway is dominant by 30%; however, the HCNH^{+} must be in its linear form. Dissociative recombination with its structural isomer, H_{2}NC^{+}, exclusively produces hydrogen isocyanide (HNC).

HCN is destroyed in interstellar clouds through a number of mechanisms depending on the location in the cloud. In photon-dominated regions (PDRs), photodissociation dominates, producing CN (HCN + ν → CN + H). At further depths, photodissociation by cosmic rays dominate, producing CN (HCN + cr → CN + H). In the dark core, two competing mechanisms destroy it, forming HCN^{+} and HCNH^{+} (HCN + H^{+} → HCN^{+} + H; HCN + HCO^{+} → HCNH^{+} + CO). The reaction with HCO^{+} dominates by a factor of ~3.5. HCN has been used to analyze a variety of species and processes in the interstellar medium. It has been suggested as a tracer for dense molecular gas and as a tracer of stellar inflow in high-mass star-forming regions. Further, the HNC/HCN ratio has been shown to be an excellent method for distinguishing between PDRs and X-ray-dominated regions (XDRs).

On 11 August 2014, astronomers released studies, using the Atacama Large Millimeter/Submillimeter Array (ALMA) for the first time, that detailed the distribution of HCN, HNC, H_{2}CO, and dust inside the comae of comets C/2012 F6 (Lemmon) and C/2012 S1 (ISON).

In February 2016, it was announced that traces of hydrogen cyanide were found in the atmosphere of the hot super-Earth 55 Cancri e with NASA's Hubble Space Telescope.

On 14 December 2023, astronomers reported the first-time discovery, in the plumes of Saturn's sixth-largest moon Enceladus, hydrogen cyanide, a possible chemical essential for life as we know it, as well as other organic molecules, some of which are yet to be better identified and understood. According to the researchers, "these [newly discovered] compounds could potentially support extant microbial communities or drive complex organic synthesis leading to the origin of life."

== As a poison and chemical weapon ==
In World War I, hydrogen cyanide was used by the French from 1916 as a chemical weapon against the Central Powers, and by the United States and Italy in 1918. It was not found to be effective enough due to weather conditions. The gas is lighter than air and rapidly disperses up into the atmosphere. Rapid dilution made its use in the field impractical. In contrast, denser agents such as phosgene or chlorine tended to remain at ground level and sank into the trenches of the Western Front's battlefields. Compared to such agents, hydrogen cyanide had to be present in higher concentrations in order to be fatal. To increase gas persistence, it was mixed with smoke producing compounds. For example, French composition called Vincennite combined 50% hydrogen cyanide with 30% arsenic trichloride and 15% stannic chloride for smoke production, plus 5% chloroform.

A hydrogen cyanide concentration of 100–200 ppm in breathing air will kill a human within 10 to 60 minutes. A hydrogen cyanide concentration of 2000 ppm (about 2380 mg/m^{3}) will kill a human in about one minute. The toxic effect is caused by the action of the cyanide ion, which halts cellular respiration. It acts as a non-competitive inhibitor for an enzyme in mitochondria called cytochrome c oxidase. As such, hydrogen cyanide is commonly listed among chemical weapons as a blood agent.

The Chemical Weapons Convention lists it under Schedule 3 as a potential weapon which has large-scale industrial uses. Signatory countries must declare manufacturing plants that produce more than 30 metric tons per year, and allow inspection by the Organisation for the Prohibition of Chemical Weapons.

Perhaps its most infamous use is Zyklon B (German: Cyclone B, with the B standing for Blausäure – prussic acid; also, to distinguish it from an earlier product later known as Zyklon A), used in the Nazi German extermination camps of Majdanek and Auschwitz-Birkenau during World War II to kill Jews and other persecuted minorities en masse as part of their Final Solution genocide program. Hydrogen cyanide was also used in the camps for delousing clothing in attempts to eradicate diseases carried by lice and other parasites. One of the original Czech producers continued making Zyklon B under the trademark "Uragan D2" until around 2015.

During World War II, the US considered using it, along with cyanogen chloride and mustard gas, as part of Operation Downfall, the planned invasion of Japan, but President Harry Truman decided against it, instead using the atomic bombs developed by the secret Manhattan Project.

Hydrogen cyanide was also the agent employed in judicial execution in some U.S. states, where it was produced during the execution by the action of sulfuric acid on sodium cyanide or potassium cyanide.

Under the name prussic acid, HCN has been used as a killing agent in whaling harpoons, though it was quickly abandoned for being dangerous to the crew. From the middle of the 18th century it was used in a number of poisoning murders and suicides.

Hydrogen cyanide gas in air is explosive at concentrations above 5.6%.
