= Hydrogen isocyanide =

Chemical compound, tautomer of hydrogen cyanide

Hydrogen cyanide bonding
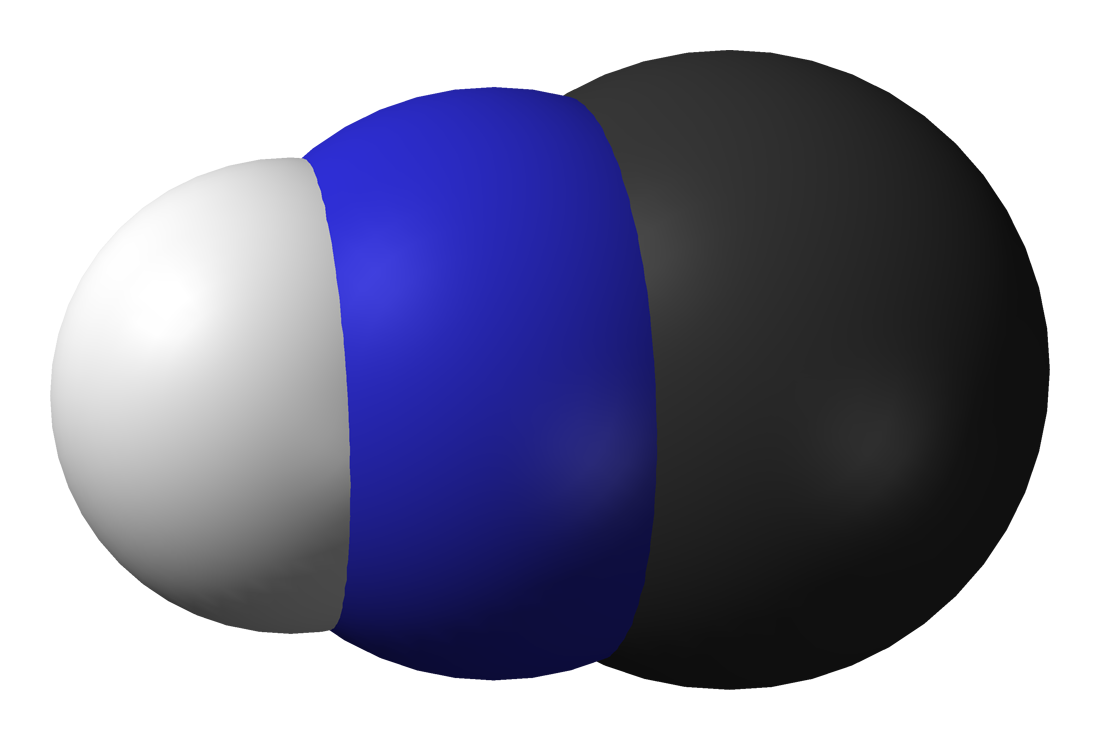
Hydrogen cyanide space filling

Names
- IUPAC names hydrogen isocyanide azanylidyniummethanide
- Other names isohydrocyanic acid hydroisocyanic acid isoprussic acid

Identifiers
CAS Number	6914-07-4
3D model (JSmol)	Interactive image
Beilstein Reference	2069401
ChEBI	CHEBI:36856
ChemSpider	4937885
Gmelin Reference	113
PubChem CID	6432654
- InChI: InChI=1S/CHN/c1-2/h2H Key: QIUBLANJVAOHHY-UHFFFAOYSA-N; InChI=1/CHN/c1-2/h2H
- SMILES: [C-]#[NH+]

Properties
Chemical formula	HNC
Molar mass	27.03 g/mol
Conjugate acid	Hydrocyanonium
Conjugate base	Cyanide
- Except where otherwise noted, data are given for materials in their standard state (at 25 °C [77 °F], 100 kPa). verify (what is ?) Infobox references

Hydrogen isocyanide is a chemical with the molecular formula HNC. It is a minor tautomer of hydrogen cyanide (HCN). Its importance in the field of astrochemistry is linked to its ubiquity in the interstellar medium.

== Nomenclature ==
Both hydrogen isocyanide and azanylidyniummethanide are correct IUPAC names for HNC. There is no preferred IUPAC name. The second one is according to the substitutive nomenclature rules, derived from the parent hydride azane (NH_{3}) and the anion methanide (CH^{−}_{3}).

== Molecular properties ==
Hydrogen isocyanide (HNC) is a linear triatomic molecule with C_{∞v} point group symmetry. It is a zwitterion and an isomer of hydrogen cyanide (HCN). Both HNC and HCN have large, similar dipole moments, with μ_{HNC} = 3.05 Debye and μ_{HCN} = 2.98 Debye respectively. These large dipole moments facilitate the easy observation of these species in the interstellar medium.

=== HNC−HCN tautomerism ===
As HNC is higher in energy than HCN by 3920 cm^{−1} (46.9 kJ/mol), one might assume that the two would have an equilibrium ratio$\left ( \frac{[HNC]}{[HCN]} \right )_{eq}$ at temperatures below 100 Kelvin of 10^{−25}. However, observations show a very different conclusion; $\left ( \frac{[HNC]}{[HCN]} \right )_{observed}$ is much higher than 10^{−25}, and is in fact on the order of unity in cold environments. This is because of the potential energy path of the tautomerization reaction; there is an activation barrier on the order of roughly 12,000 cm^{−1} for the tautomerization to occur, which corresponds to a temperature at which HNC would already have been destroyed by neutral-neutral reactions.

== Spectral properties ==
In practice, HNC is almost exclusively observed astronomically using the J = 1→0 transition. This transition occurs at ~90.66 GHz, which is a point of good visibility in the atmospheric window, thus making astronomical observations of HNC particularly simple. Many other related species (including HCN) are observed in roughly the same window.

== Significance in the interstellar medium ==
HNC is intricately linked to the formation and destruction of numerous other molecules of importance in the interstellar medium—aside from the obvious partners HCN, protonated hydrogen cyanide (HCNH^{+}), and cyanide (CN), HNC is linked to the abundances of many other compounds, either directly or through a few degrees of separation. As such, an understanding of the chemistry of HNC leads to an understanding of countless other species—HNC is an integral piece in the complex puzzle representing interstellar chemistry.

Furthermore, HNC (alongside HCN) is a commonly used tracer of dense gas in molecular clouds. Aside from the potential to use HNC to investigate gravitational collapse as the means of star formation, HNC abundance (relative to the abundance of other nitrogenous molecules) can be used to determine the evolutionary stage of protostellar cores.

The HCO^{+}/HNC line ratio is used to good effect as a measure of density of gas. This information provides great insight into the mechanisms of the formation of (Ultra-)Luminous Infrared Galaxies ((U)LIRGs), as it provides data on the nuclear environment, star formation, and even black hole fueling. Furthermore, the HNC/HCN line ratio is used to distinguish between photodissociation regions and X-ray-dissociation regions on the basis that [HNC]/[HCN] is roughly unity in the former, but greater than unity in the latter.

The study of HNC is relatively straightforward, which is a major motivation for its research. Its J = 1→0 transition occurs in a clear portion of the atmospheric window, and it has numerous isotopomers that are easily studied. Additionally, its large dipole moment makes observations particularly simple. Moreover, HNC is a fundamentally simple molecule in its molecular nature. This makes the study of the reaction pathways that lead to its formation and destruction a good means of obtaining insight to the workings of these reactions in space. Furthermore, the study of the tautomerization of HNC to HCN (and vice versa), which has been studied extensively, has been suggested as a model by which more complicated isomerization reactions can be studied.

== Chemistry in the interstellar medium ==
HNC is found primarily in dense molecular clouds, though it is ubiquitous in the interstellar medium. Its abundance is closely linked to the abundances of other nitrogen-containing compounds. HNC is formed primarily through the dissociative recombination of HNCH^{+} and H_{2}NC^{+}, and it is destroyed primarily through ion-neutral reactions with H^{+}_{3} and C^{+}. Rate calculations were done at 3.16 × 10^{5} years, which is considered early time, and at 20 K, which is a typical temperature for dense molecular clouds.

Formation Reactions
Reactant 1	Reactant 2	Product 1	Product 2	Rate constant	Rate/[H_{2}]^{2}	Relative Rate
HCNH^{+}	e^{−}	HNC	H	9.50×10^{−8}	4.76×10^{−25}	3.4
H_{2}NC^{+}	e^{−}	HNC	H	1.80×10^{−7}	1.39×10^{−25}	1.0
Destruction Reactions
Reactant 1	Reactant 2	Product 1	Product 2	Rate constant	Rate/[H_{2}]^{2}	Relative Rate
H^{+}_{3}	HNC	HCNH^{+}	H_{2}	8.10×10^{−9}	1.26×10^{−24}	1.7
C^{+}	HNC	C_{2}N^{+}	H	3.10×10^{−9}	7.48×10^{−25}	1.0

These four reactions are merely the four most dominant, and thus the most significant in the formation of the HNC abundances in dense molecular clouds; there are dozens more reactions for the formation and destruction of HNC. Though these reactions primarily lead to various protonated species, HNC is linked closely to the abundances of many other nitrogen containing molecules, for example, NH_{3} and CN. The abundance HNC is also inexorably linked to the abundance of HCN, and the two tend to exist in a specific ratio based on the environment. This is because the reactions that form HNC can often also form HCN, and vice versa, depending on the conditions in which the reaction occurs, and also that there exist isomerization reactions for the two species.

== Astronomical detections ==
HCN (not HNC) was first detected in June 1970 by L. E. Snyder and D. Buhl using the 36-foot radio telescope of the National Radio Astronomy Observatory. The main molecular isotope, H^{12}C^{14}N, was observed via its J = 1→0 transition at 88.6 GHz in six different sources: W3 (OH), Orion A, Sgr A(NH3A), W49, W51, DR 21(OH). A secondary molecular isotope, H^{13}C^{14}N, was observed via its J = 1→0 transition at 86.3 GHz in only two of these sources: Orion A and Sgr A(NH3A). HNC was then later detected extragalactically in 1988 using the IRAM 30-m telescope at the Pico de Veleta in Spain. It was observed via its J = 1→0 transition at 90.7 GHz toward IC 342.

A number of detections have been made towards the end of confirming the temperature dependence of the abundance ratio of [HNC]/[HCN]. A strong fit between temperature and the abundance ratio would allow observers to spectroscopically detect the ratio and then extrapolate the temperature of the environment, thus gaining great insight into the environment of the species. The abundance ratio of rare isotopes of HNC and HCN along the OMC-1 varies by more than an order of magnitude in warm regions versus cold regions. In 1992, the abundances of HNC, HCN, and deuterated analogs along the OMC-1 ridge and core were measured and the temperature dependence of the abundance ratio was confirmed. A survey of the W 3 Giant Molecular Cloud in 1997 showed over 24 different molecular isotopes, comprising over 14 distinct chemical species, including HNC, HN^{13}C, and H^{15}NC. This survey further confirmed the temperature dependence of the abundance ratio, [HNC]/[HCN], this time even confirming the dependence of the isotopomers.

These are not the only detections of importance of HNC in the interstellar medium. In 1997, HNC was observed along the TMC-1 ridge and its abundance relative to HCO^{+} was found to be constant along the ridge—this led credence to the reaction pathway that posits that HNC is derived initially from HCO^{+}. One significant astronomical detection that demonstrated the practical use of observing HNC occurred in 2006, when abundances of various nitrogenous compounds (including HN^{13}C and H^{15}NC) were used to determine the stage of evolution of the protostellar core Cha-MMS1 based on the relative magnitudes of the abundances.

On 11 August 2014, astronomers released studies, using the Atacama Large Millimeter/Submillimeter Array (ALMA) for the first time, that detailed the distribution of HCN, HNC, H_{2}CO, and dust inside the comae of comets C/2012 F6 (Lemmon) and C/2012 S1 (ISON).

== See also ==
- Isocyanide – Chemical compound with the group –N+≡C–
