= Aminomalononitrile =

Names
- Other names 2-aminomalononitrile, AMN

Identifiers
CAS Number	5181-05-5
3D model (JSmol)	Interactive image
ChemSpider	133313
PubChem CID	151258
CompTox Dashboard (EPA)	DTXSID40199760
- InChI: InChI=1S/C3H3N3/c4-1-3(6)2-5/h3H,6H2 Key: GXDKXRIMUVUELI-UHFFFAOYSA-N
- SMILES: C(#N)C(C#N)N

Properties
Chemical formula	C_{3}H_{3}N_{3}
Molar mass	81.078 g·mol^{−1}
- Except where otherwise noted, data are given for materials in their standard state (at 25 °C [77 °F], 100 kPa). Infobox references

Aminomalononitrile (AMN) is the organic compound with the formula H_{2}NCH(CN)_{2}. As the name indicates, it can be viewed as an amine-substituted malononitrile.

AMN is of some interest to the study of the chemical origin of life because it represents a trimer of HCN, speculated to be a progenitor of nucleic acids.

Aminomalononitrile has been prepared by reduction of the oxime HONC=(CN)_{2} with aluminium amalgam. The compound can be used in situ or isolated as the tosylate salt ([H_{3}NCH(CN)_{2}]OTs where ^{-}OTs is CH_{3}C_{6}H_{4}SO^{−}_{3}):

AMN reacts with cyanide to give diaminomaleonitrile, a tetramer of HCN:

This easy conversion has been the source of some confusion.
