= Dissociative recombination =

Chemical reaction in which a molecular ion is neutralized by an electron and degrades

Dissociative recombination is a chemical process in which a positive polyatomic ion recombines with an electron, and as a result, the neutral molecule dissociates. This reaction is important for interstellar and atmospheric chemistry. On Earth, dissociative recombination rarely occurs naturally, as free electrons react with any molecule (even neutral molecules) they encounter. Even in the best laboratory conditions, dissociative recombination is hard to observe, but it is an important reaction in systems which have large populations of ionized molecules such as atmospheric-pressure plasmas.

In astrophysics, dissociative recombination is one of the main mechanisms by which molecules are broken down, and other molecules are formed. The existence of dissociative recombination is possible due to the vacuum of the interstellar medium. A typical example of dissociative recombination in astrophysics is:

CH^{+}_{3} + e^{−} → CH_{2} + H

== See also ==
- Astrochemistry
- Ionization
