= Mononitride =

Mononitride may refer to:

- Boron mononitride, BN
- Aluminium mononitride, AlN
- Phosphorus mononitride, PN
- Scandium mononitride, ScN
- Titanium mononitride, TiN
- Vanadium mononitride, VN
- Chromium mononitride, CrN
- Gallium mononitride, GaN
- Yttrium mononitride, YN
- Zirconium mononitride, ZrN
- Niobium mononitride, NbN
- Indium mononitride, InN
- Antimony mononitride, SbN
- Praseodymium mononitride, ScN
- Neodymium mononitride, NdN
- Tantalum mononitride, TaN
- Tungsten mononitride, WN
