= Phosphorus monoxide =

Chemical compound

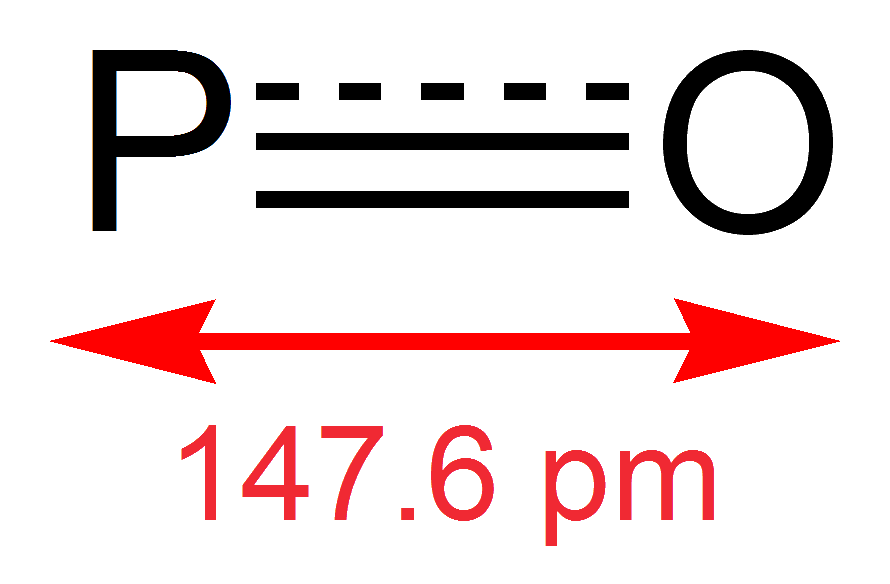

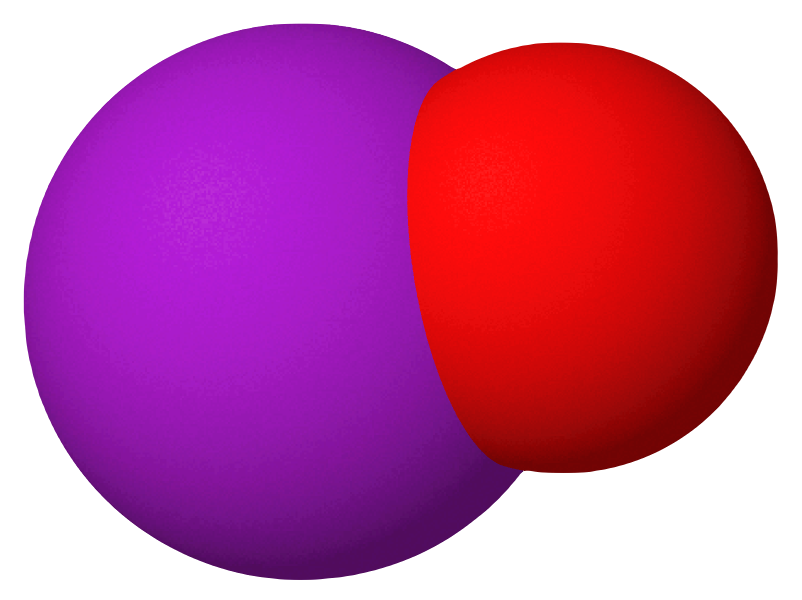

Names
- Other names oxophosphanyl; oxidophosphorus(.); Phosphoryl

Identifiers
CAS Number	14452-66-5
3D model (JSmol)	Interactive image
ChEBI	CHEBI:29315
ChemSpider	5256764
Gmelin Reference	416
PubChem CID	6857426
CompTox Dashboard (EPA)	DTXSID70425882
- InChI: InChI=1S/OP/c1-2 Key: LFGREXWGYUGZLY-UHFFFAOYSA-N
- SMILES: O=[P]

Properties
Chemical formula	PO
- Except where otherwise noted, data are given for materials in their standard state (at 25 °C [77 °F], 100 kPa). Infobox references

Phosphorus monoxide is an unstable radical inorganic compound with molecular formula PO.

Phosphorus monoxide is notable as one of the few molecular compounds containing phosphorus that has been detected outside of Earth. Other phosphorus containing molecules found in space include PN, PC, PC_{2}, HCP and PH_{3}. It was detected in the circumstellar shell of VY Canis Majoris and in the star forming region catalogued as AFGL 5142. The compound has been found to have been initially produced in star-forming regions, and speculated to be carried by interstellar comets throughout outer space, including to the early Earth.

Phosphorus monoxide plays a role in the phosphorescence of phosphorus.

== Discovery ==
In 1894 W. N. Hartley was the first to report an observation of ultraviolet emission from a phosphorus compound, that was later expanded on by Geuter. The source of the spectral lines and bands were known to be related to phosphorus, but the exact nature was unknown. In 1927 H. J. Emeléus and R. H. Purcell determined that the cause was a phosphorus oxide. But it was in 1921 that P. N. Ghosh and G. N. Ball determined that the oxide was phosphorus monoxide.

Phosphorus monoxide is believed to be the most abundant phosphorus-containing molecule found in interstellar clouds. Phosphorus was identified as a cosmically abundant element in 1998 after researchers found a cosmic ratio of phosphorus to hydrogen (P/H) of about 3×10^{−7}. Even with the prevalence of phosphorus in interstellar clouds, very few phosphorus bearing molecules had been identified and found in very few sources; phosphorus nitride, PN, and the free radical CP were found in a carbon rich envelope of IRC +10215 in 1987. This suggested that more phosphorus containing molecules had to be found in interstellar space. While examining the oxygen-rich shell of the supergiant star VY Canis Majoris (VY CMa) the presence of PO was detected. VY CMa was studied using the Submillimeter Telescope (SMT) of the Arizona Radio Observatory (ARO). The telescope was able to observe the rotational frequencies of PO. ARO's 10 m SMT was able to measure the rotational transitions of PO showing J=5.5→4.5 at 240 GHz and J=6.5→5.5 at 284 GHz toward the evolved star, each consisting of well-defined lambda-doublets. Since the detection of PO towards the envelope of the VY CMa supergiant in 2001, PO has been found in many more interstellar clouds and is found in abundance around oxygen-rich shells.

== Formation ==
PO is formed when phosphorus is burnt in oxygen or ozone. It is a transient molecule observed in hot flames, or can be condensed into noble gas matrix. PO can be formed in an inert gas matrix in the photolysis of P_{4}S_{3}O, a phosphorus oxysulfide.

On Earth, phosphorus monoxide can be prepared for study by spraying phosphoric acid into a flame. Because commercial acetylene gas contains some phosphine, an oxy-acetylene flame will have weak PO emission bands in its spectrum also. In the flame, PO oxidises back to P_{4}O_{10}.

== Reactions ==
=== Phosphorescence ===
As white phosphorus oxidises it gives out a greenish-white glow. The glow happens as PO is oxidised by one of these reactions: PO + O^{•} → PO_{2}; or PO + O_{2} →PO_{2} + O^{•}. The possible ways that PO appears in this process is by breakup of the P_{2}O molecule which in turn may come from P_{4}O.

=== Ligand ===
Phosphorus monoxide can act as a ligand on transition elements such as molybdenum, ruthenium and osmium. The phosphorus forms a triple bond with the metal. The first to be discovered was on a nickel-tungsten cluster. The WNi_{2}P_{2} cluster was oxidised by a peroxide to yield a μ_{3}-coordination, where each phosphorus atom is bound to three metal atoms.

== Properties ==
=== Bond ===
Phosphorus monoxide is a free radical with phosphorus double bonded to oxygen with phosphorus having an unpaired valence electron. The bond order is about 1.8. The P=O bond in PO has a dissociation energy of 6.4 eV. The bond length of the PO double bond is 1.476 Å, and free PO shows an infrared vibrational frequency of 1220 cm^{−1} due to the stretching of the bond. The free radical nature of PO makes it highly reactive and unstable compared to other phosphorus oxides that have been further oxidized.

=== Spectrum ===
The visible to ultraviolet spectrum of phosphorus monoxide has three important bands. There is a continuum band near 540 nm. The β-system near 324 nm is due to the D^{2}Σ→^{2}Π transition. The γ-system has bands near 246 nm due to a A^{2}Σ→^{2}Π transition. Peaks in this band occur at 230, 238, 246, 253, and 260 nm in the ultraviolet. All these bands can be emission, absorption, or fluorescence depending on the method of illumination and temperature. There is also a C'^{2}Δ state.

The γ-system band can be broken down into sub-bands based on the different vibrational transitions. (0,0), (0,1) and (1,0) are designations for the sub-bands produced by the transition between two vibration states, as the electronic transition occurs. Each of these contains eight series termed branches. These are ^{o}P_{12}, P_{2}, Q_{2}, R_{2}, P_{1}, Q_{1}, R_{1} and ^{s}R_{21}.

=== Molecule ===
The ionisation potential of PO is 8.39 eV. When ionised, PO forms the cation PO^{+}. The adiabatic electron affinity of PO is 1.09 eV. On gaining an electron the PO^{−} ion forms.

r_{e} in the ground state is 1.4763735 Å.

The dipole moment of the molecule is 1.88 D. The phosphorus atom has a slight positive charge calculated as 0.35 of the electron.

== See also ==
- Nitric oxide
- Phosphorus mononitride
