= Phosphoryl nitride =

Molecule with formula OPN

Names
- IUPAC name Azanylidyne(oxo)-λ^{5}-phosphane
- Other names: Phosphonitrile oxide; Phosphoronitride oxide; Phosphorus nitride oxide; Phosphorus oxide nitride; Phosphorus oxynitride

Identifiers
CAS Number	23369-45-1
3D model (JSmol)	Interactive image
PubChem CID	15919777
- InChI: InChI=1S/NOP/c1-3-2 Key: CMMOOVZPVLKJPM-UHFFFAOYSA-N
- SMILES: N#P=O

Properties
Chemical formula	NOP
Molar mass	60.980 g·mol^{−1}

Related compounds
Related compounds	Phosphorus mononitride
- Except where otherwise noted, data are given for materials in their standard state (at 25 °C [77 °F], 100 kPa). Infobox references

Phosphoryl nitride is an inorganic chemical with the structure O=P≡N. It is a linear molecule consisting of oxygen, phosphorus, and nitrogen. It has a formal double bond between P and O (a phosphoryl substructure) and a triple bond between P and N (a nitride). It can be obtained in argon matrix isolation at 16 K by laser photolysis of phosphoryl triazide, OP(N_{3})_{3}. The O=P≡N molecule and its isomer O^{–}–N^{+}≡P can interconvert by photoisomerization. Both of these linear molecules are valence isoelectronic to N_{2}O. The stabilities of OPN, ONP, and a cyclic isomer have been studied theoretically in terms of relative stability and periodic-table trends.

Bulk phosphoryl nitride has many polymorphs, similar to its isoelectronic counterpart, silicon dioxide.
