= Phosphorus mononitride =

Phosphorus nitride

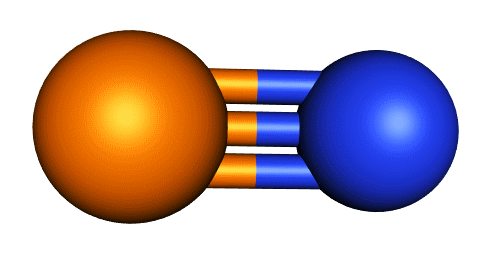

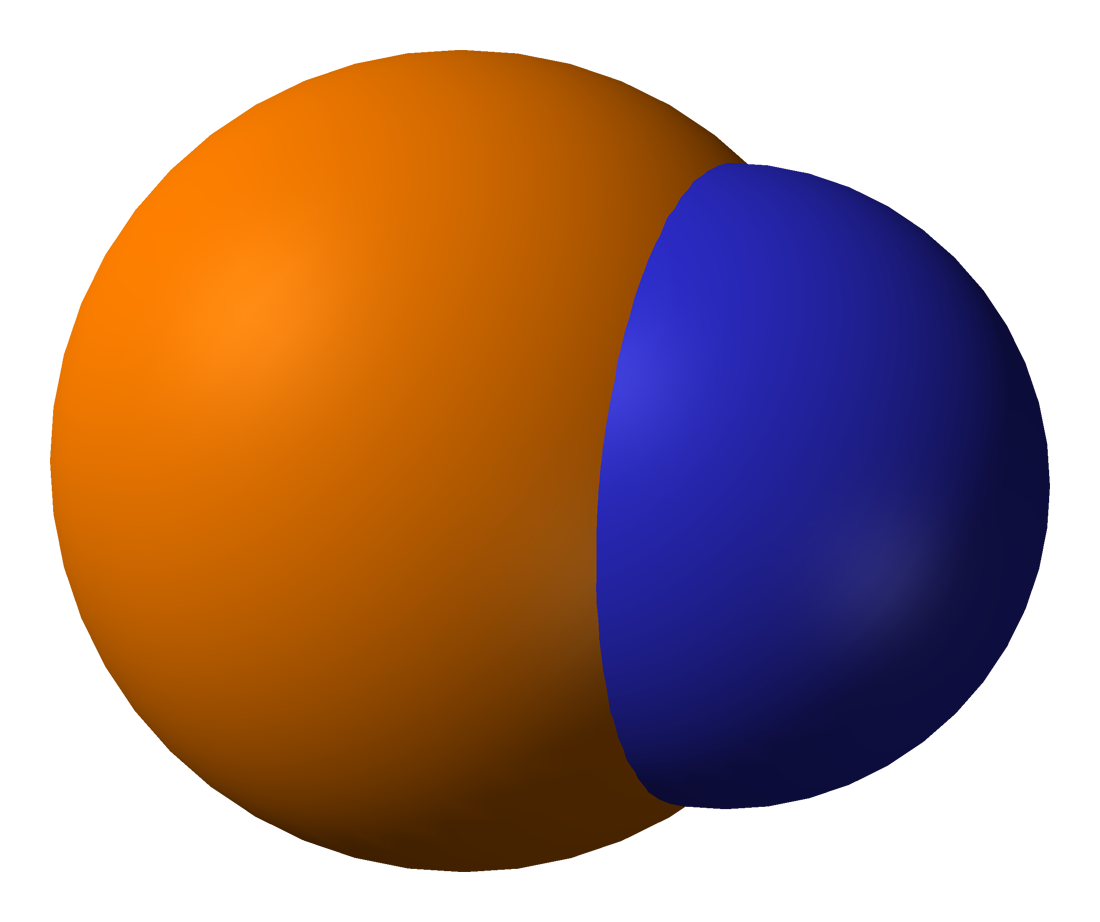

Names
- IUPAC name Azanylidynephosphane
- Other names Phosphorus nitride

Identifiers
CAS Number	17739-47-8
3D model (JSmol)	Interactive image
ChemSpider	104952
PubChem CID	117441
CompTox Dashboard (EPA)	DTXSID9066255
- InChI: InChI=1S/NP/c1-2 Key: AOPJVJYWEDDOBI-UHFFFAOYSA-N
- SMILES: N#P

Properties
Chemical formula	PN
Molar mass	44.981 g·mol^{−1}

Related compounds
Related compounds	Phosphoryl nitride
- Except where otherwise noted, data are given for materials in their standard state (at 25 °C [77 °F], 100 kPa). Infobox references

Phosphorus mononitride is an inorganic compound with the chemical formula PN. Containing only phosphorus and nitrogen, this material is classified as a binary nitride. From the Lewis structure perspective, it can be represented with a P-N triple bond with a lone pair on each atom. It is isoelectronic with N_{2}, CO, P_{2}, CS, NO^{+}, CN^{−} and SiO.

The compound is highly unstable in standard conditions, tending to rapidly self polymerize. It can be isolated within argon and krypton matrices at 10 K (−263.1 °C). Due to its instability, documentation of reactions with other molecules is limited. Most of its reactivity has thus far been probed and studied at transition metal centers.

Phosphorus mononitride was the first identified phosphorus compound in the interstellar medium and is even thought to be an important molecule in the atmospheres of Jupiter and Saturn.

== Discovery and interstellar occurrence ==
The existence of free, gas-phase phosphorus mononitride was confirmed spectroscopically in 1934 by Nobel laureate, Gerhard Herzberg, and coworkers. J. Curry, L. Herzberg, and G. Herzberg made the accidental discovery after observing new bands in the UV region from 2375 to 2992 Å following an electric discharge within an air-filled tube that had been earlier exposed to phosphorus.

In 1987, phosphorus mononitride was detected in the Orion KL Nebula, the W51M nebula in Aquila, and Saggitarius B2 simultaneously by Turner, Bally, and Ziurys. Data from radio telescopes allowed for observation of rotational lines associated with the J = 2-1, 3-2, 5-4, and 6-5 transitions.

In the following decades, a rapid expansion of interstellar PN observations ensued, detected frequently alongside PO. Examples include within shocked regions of L1157, within the Galactic Center, in carbon-rich envelopes in CRL 2688 (alongside HCP) and oxygen-rich envelopes toward VY Canis Majoris, TX Camelopardalis, R. Cassiopeiae, and NML Cygni.

ALMA data alongside spectroscopic measurements from the Rosetta probe have shown PN being carried from the comet 67P/Churyumov–Gerasimenko alongside the far more abundant PO. These observations may offer insight to how pre-biotic matter could be transported to planets. In cases where PN and PO are observed in the same region, the latter is more abundant. The consistency of the molecular ratio between these two interstellar molecules across many different interstellar clouds is thought to be a sign of a shared formation pathway between the two molecules. PN is mostly detected in hot, turbulent regions, where the shock induced sputtering of dust grain is thought to contribute to its formation. However, it has also been confirmed in massive dense cores which are by comparison "cold and quiescent".

In 2022, researchers used data from the ALMA Comprehensive High-resolution Extragalactic Molecular Inventory (ALCHEMI) project and reported evidence of phosphorus mononitride in giant molecular clouds within the galaxy, NGC 253. This finding marks phosphorus mononitride as the first extragalactic phosphorus containing molecule detected as well. In 2023, Ziurys and coworkers showed the existence of PN and PO in WB89-621 (22.6 kpc from the Galactic Center) using rotational spectroscopy. Prior, phosphorus was only observed in the inner Milky Way (12kpc). Since supernovae do not occur in outer regions of the galaxy, the detection of these phosphorus-bearing molecules in WB89-621 provides evidence of additional alternative sources of phosphorus formation, such as non-explosive, lower mass asymptotic giant branch stars. The levels were detected at comparable values to that in the Solar System.

== Electronic structure, spectral and bonding properties ==
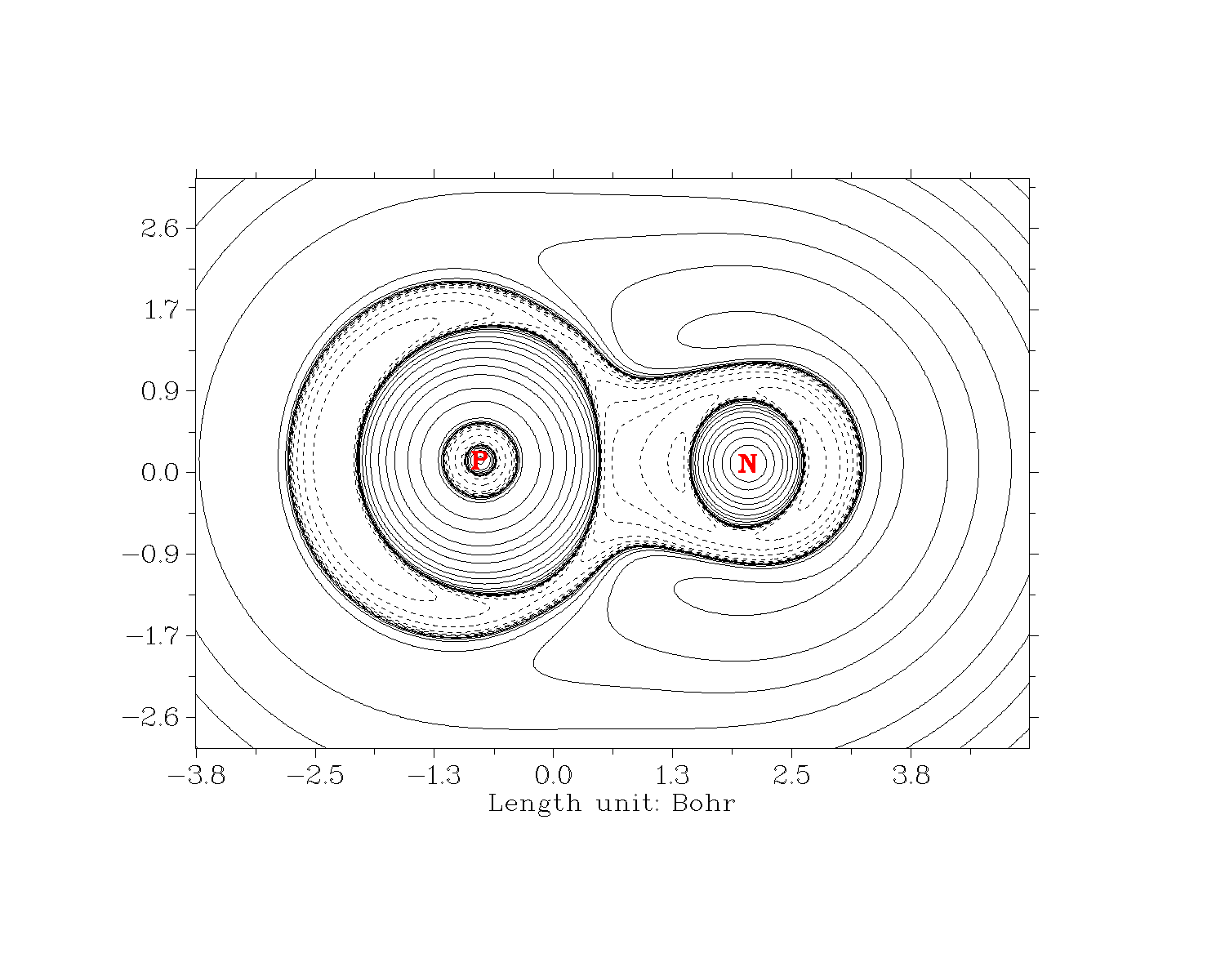
PN 2D electron density Laplacian contour plot. Calculated analogously to Kupka et al. at the CCSD/aug-cc-pCVQZ level.

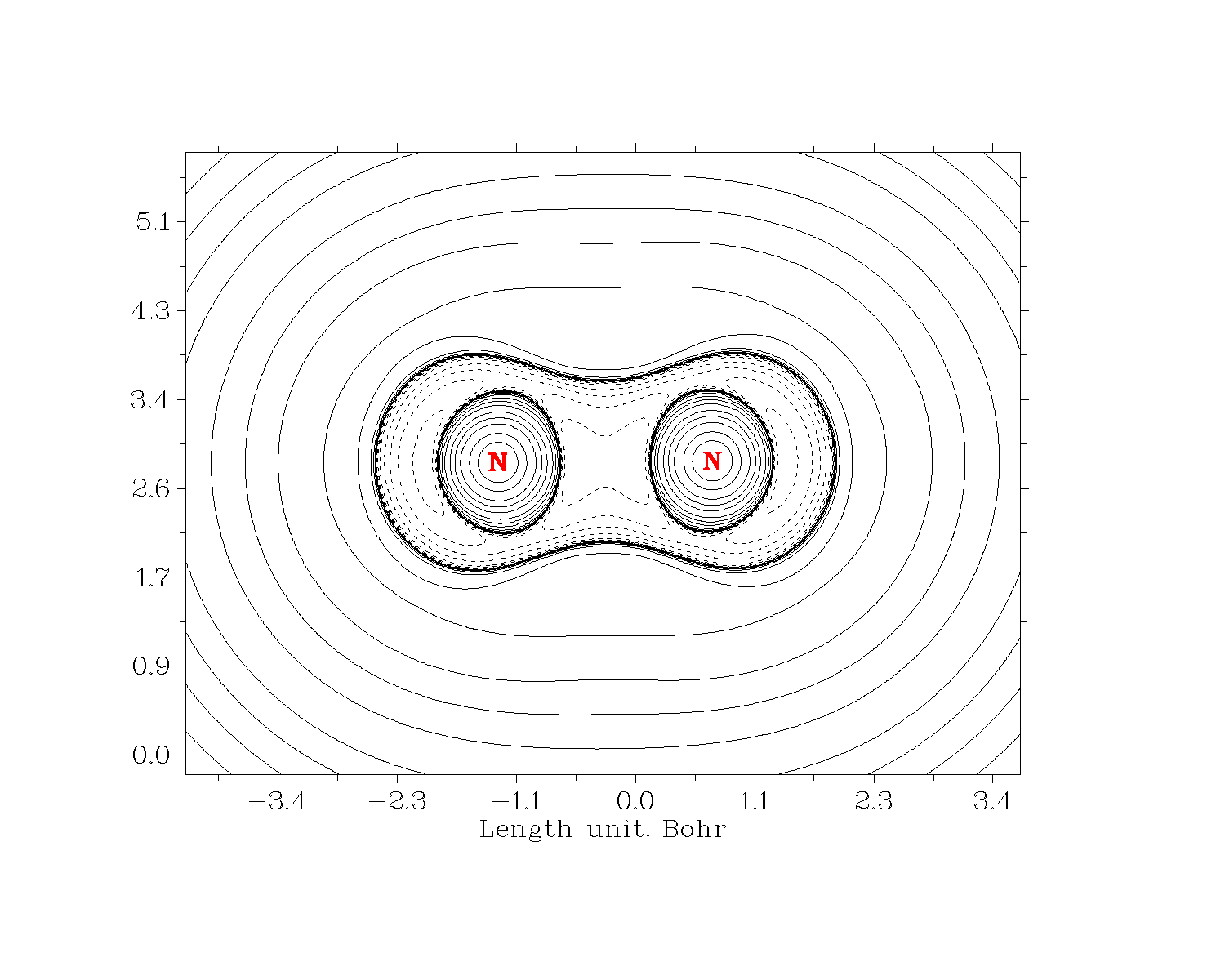
N_{2} 2D electron density Laplacian contour plot. Calculated analogously to Kupka et al. at the CCSD/aug-cc-pCVQZ level.

PN formation from gaseous phosphorus and nitrogen is endothermic.

½ P_{2} + ½ N_{2} = PN (E_{R} = 117 ± 10kJ/mol)

Early mass spectrometry studies by Gingerich yielded a PN dissociation energy D_{0} of 146.6 ± 5.0 kcal/mol (613 ± 21 kJ/mol; 6.36 ± 0.22 eV).

It is predicted to have a high proton affinity (PA = 191 kcal/mol (800 kJ/mol)).

Early rotational analysis of 24 of the bands from Herzberg's original study suggested a PN internuclear distance of 1.49 Å, intermediate between N_{2} (1.094 Å) and P_{2} (1.856 Å). The associated electronic transition, ^{1}Π → ^{1}Σ, was noted to be similar to that of the isoelectronic CS and SiO molecules. Later rotational spectra studies aligned well with these findings, for example analysis of millimeter wave rotational PN spectra from a microwave spectrometer yielded a bond distance of 1.49085 (2) Å.

Infrared studies of gaseous PN at high temperatures assign its vibrational frequency (ω_{e}) to 1337.24 cm^{−1} and interatomic separation of 1.4869 Å.

Simple comparisons to tabulated experimental and calculated bond lengths match well with a PN triple bond according to Pyykkö's Triple-Bond Covalent Radii.

NBO analyses support a single neutral resonance structure with a PN triple bond and one lone pair on each atom. However, natural population analysis shows nitrogen as significantly negatively charged (-0.82603) and phosphorus as significantly positively charged (0.82603). This is in line with the large dipole moment and partial ionic character reflecting the electron density contour plots.

Monomeric PN in a krypton matrix at 10 K (−263.1 °C) gives rise to a single IR band at 1323 cm^{−1}.

Auer and Neese have produced calculated gas phase ^{31}P and ^{15}N NMR chemical shifts of 51.61 and -344.71 respectively at the CCSD(T)/p4 level of theory. However, different functionals and basis sets yield dramatically different predictions for chemical shielding and so far experimental NMR shifts for phosphorus mononitride remain elusive.

Molecular beam electric resonance spectroscopy has been used to determine the radio frequency spectrum of phosphorus mononitride generated from P_{3}N_{5} thermolysis; the experimental results showed an experimental PN dipole moment (μ) of 2.7465 +- 0.0001 D, 2.7380 +-0.001 D, and 2.7293 +-0.0001 D for the first three vibrational levels respectively.

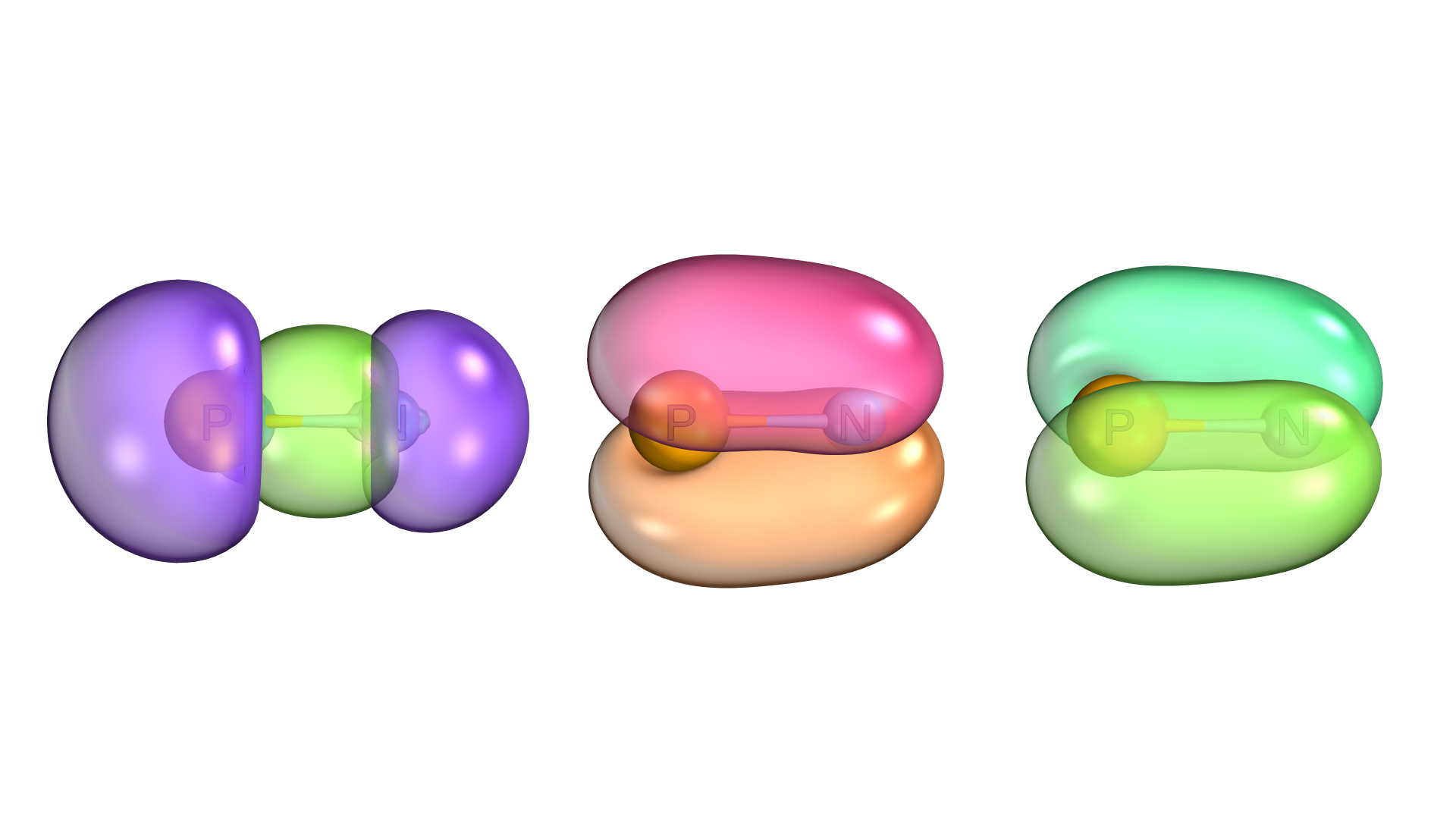
Occupied intrinsic bond orbitals (IBOs) of PN. Example calculated at the PBE0-D3BJ level of theory using the def2-TZVP basis set with ORCA. (Left): Two lone pairs + one P-N sigma bond. (Middle + Right): Degenerate perpendicular pi bond pair.

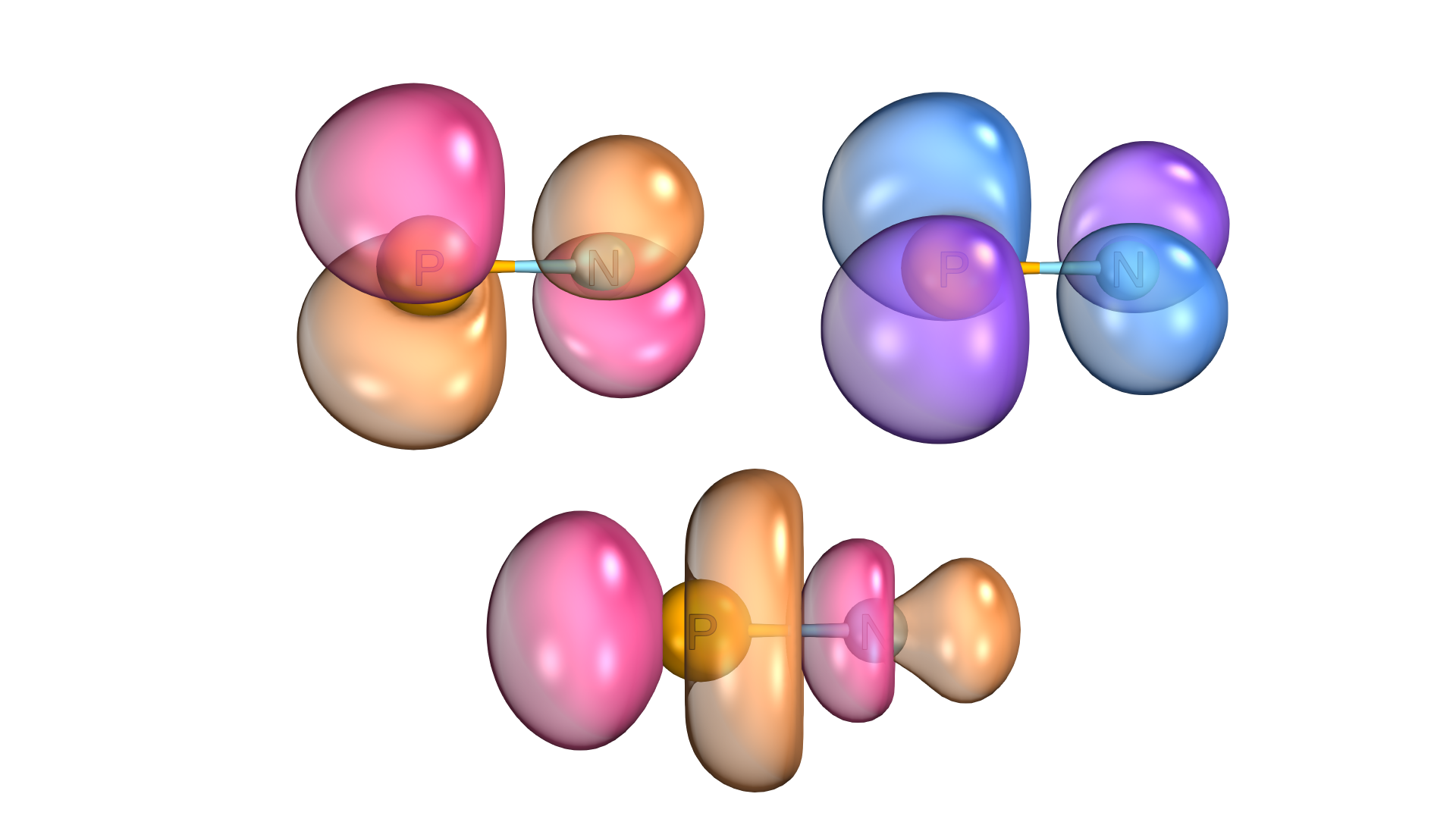
Valence virtual IBOs of PN. Example calculated at the PBE0-D3BJ level of theory using the def2-TZVP basis set with ORCA. (Top): Degenerate pi antibonding orbitals relevant to pi backbonding (in relation to LUMO).

Its dipole moment is larger than PO (1.88 D), despite the greater electronegativity difference between the constituent P and O atoms and similar bond length (1.476 Å). This a result of the significant differences in bonds and charge distribution within the PN and PO molecules. The large PN dipole moment makes it very favorable with respect to radio-astronomical studies in comparison to N_{2} - which lacks this property.

In consideration to molecular orbitals of PN, direct analogies can be drawn to the bonding in the N_{2} molecule. It consists of an P-N σ bonding orbital (HOMO), with two perpendicular degenerate P-N pi bonding orbitals. Likewise, the LUMOs of PN, which consist of a degenerate PN pi-antibonding set, allow it to backbond with orbitals of appropriate symmetry.

However, in comparison to N_{2}, the HOMO of PN is higher in energy (est. -9.2 eV vs -12.2 eV), and, the LUMOs are lower in energy (-2.3 eV vs -0.6 eV), thus making it both a better σ-donor and pi-acceptor as a ligand.

Evidently, the smaller HOMO–LUMO gap of PN, combined with its polar nature and low dissociation energy contribute to its much greater reactivity than dinitrogen (including at the interstellar level).

== Preparation and formation ==
=== Interstellar formation ===
The pathways to the formation of PN are still not fully understood, but likely involve competing gaseous phase reactions with other interstellar molecules. Important schemes are shown below along with competing exothermic reactions:

PO + N → PN + O

PO + N → P + NO (Competing)

Another important, very exothermic formation reaction:

PH + N → PN + H

From carbon containing environments:

P + CN → PN + C

N + CP → PN + C

An important destruction pathway:

PN + N → N_{2} + P

The abundance of interstellar PN is additionally perturbed by cosmic-ray ionization, visual extinction, and adsorption/desorption from dust grains.

=== Electric discharge ===
Moldenhauer and Dörsam first generated transient PN in 1924 using an electric discharge through N_{2} and phosphorus vapors, where the characterized product was a notably robust powder containing equal parts phosphorus and nitrogen. This same method led to the actual first observation of PN by Gerhard and coworkers.

PN has also been produced at room temperature using microwave discharges on mixtures of gaseous PCl_{3} and N_{2} under moderate vacuum. This preparation was employed to achieve high resolution FTIR spectra of PN.

=== Flash pyrolysis ===
Atkins and Timms later generated PN via flash pyrolysis of P_{3}N_{5} under high vacuum, allowing the recording of the PN infrared spectrum within a cryogenic krypton matrix. Solid triphosphorus pentanitride generates gaseous, free PN when heated to 800–900 °C (1,070–1,170 K) under high vacuum.

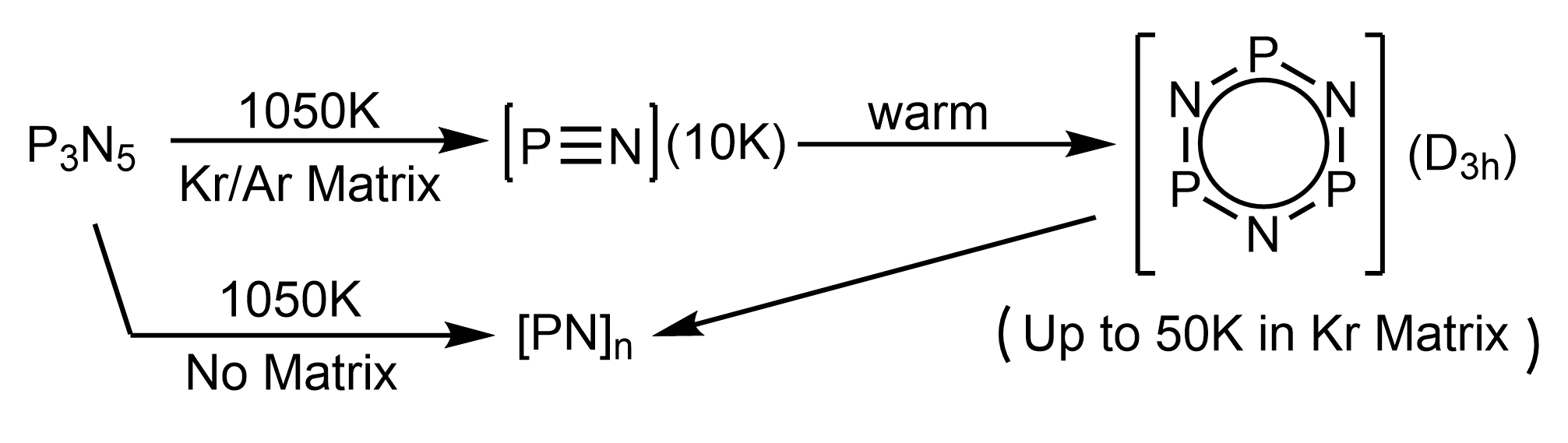
P_{3}N_{5} flash pyrolysis methodology from Atkins and Timms. Depicts intermediate(s) in matrix isolation, and polymerization.

Monomeric PN can only be isolated in krypton or argon matrices at 10 K (−263.1 °C). Upon warming up past 30 K (−243.2 °C), cyclotriphosphazene, which has D_{3h} symmetry, is formed (up to 50 K (−223.2 °C) before krypton matrix melts). The (PN)_{3} trimer and is planar and aromatic, with ^{15}N-labelling experiments revealing a planar E' mode band at 1141 cm^{−1}. No dimers or other oligomers are even transiently observed.

Without a cryoscopic matrix, these reactions result in the immediate formation of (PN)_{n} polymers.

Thermolysis experiments of dimethyl phosphoramidate have shown PN to form as a major decomposition product along with many other minor components including the ·P=O radical and HOP=O. This is contrasting to dimethyl methylphosphonate in which said minor components become the major decomposition products, highlighting significantly diverging pathways.

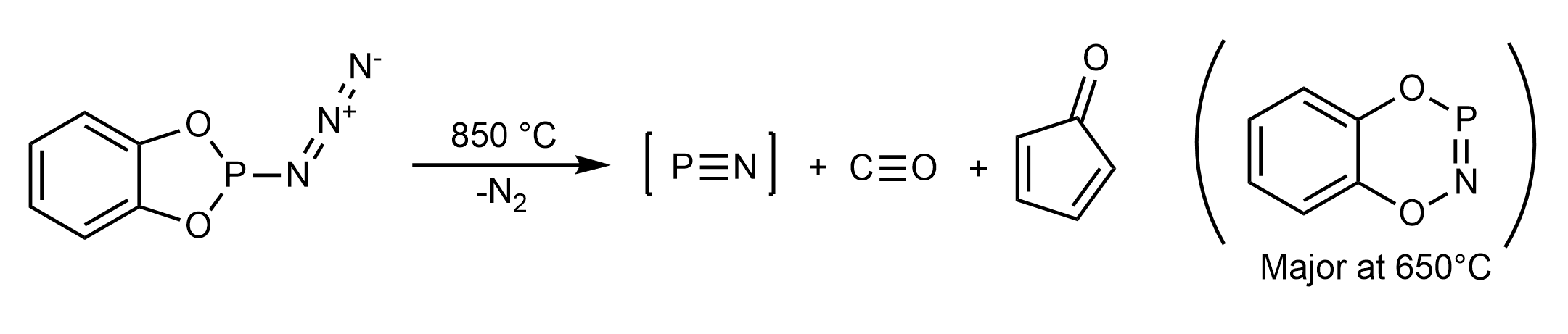
Phosphinoazide pyrolysis to PN and byproducts from Qian, Wende, Schreiner, and Mardyukov. At lower pyrolysis temperatures, a different major product forms.

In 2023, Qian et al. proposed PN to be generated as a major product along with CO and cyclopentadienone byproducts when (o-phenyldioxyl)phosphinoazide is heated to 850 °C (following the loss of N_{2}). However, efforts to observe free PN in argon matrices using this method were unsuccessful due to band overlaps.

=== Dehalogenation of hexachlorophosphazene ===
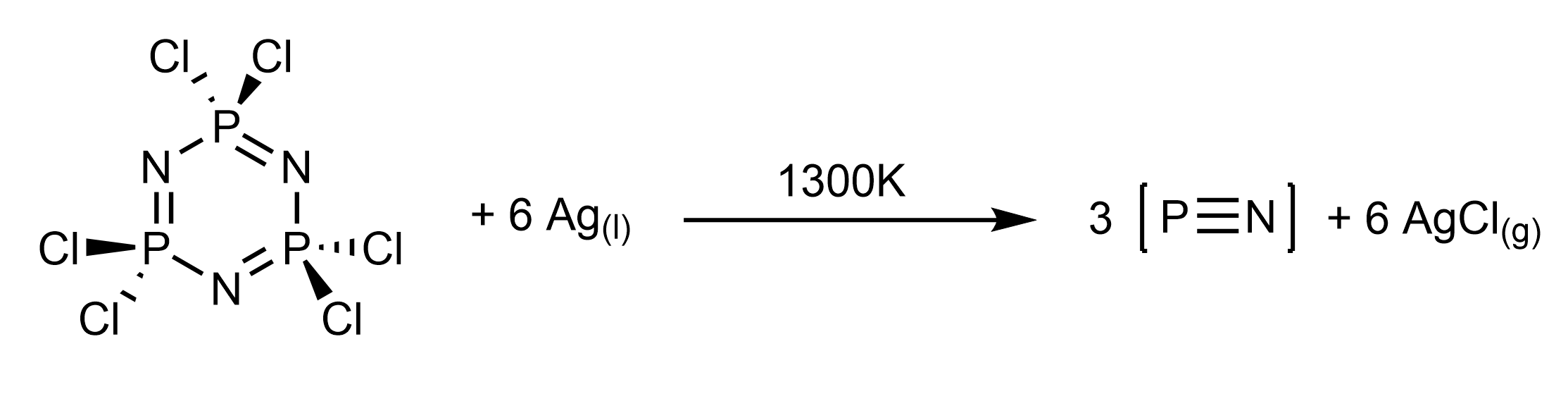
Dehalogenation reaction of hexachlorophosphazene using molten silver from Schnöckel et al.

Schnöckel and coworkers later showed an alternative synthesis involving the dehalogenation of hexachlorophosphazene with molten silver, with concomitant loss of AgCl. In both this route and the P_{3}N_{5} thermolysis route, only trace P_{2} and P_{4} formation is detected even at 1,200 K (930 °C), showing the reaction temperatures occur far from thermodynamic equilibrium.

=== Anthracene release from dibenzo-7λ^{3} -phosphanorbornadiene derivatives ===
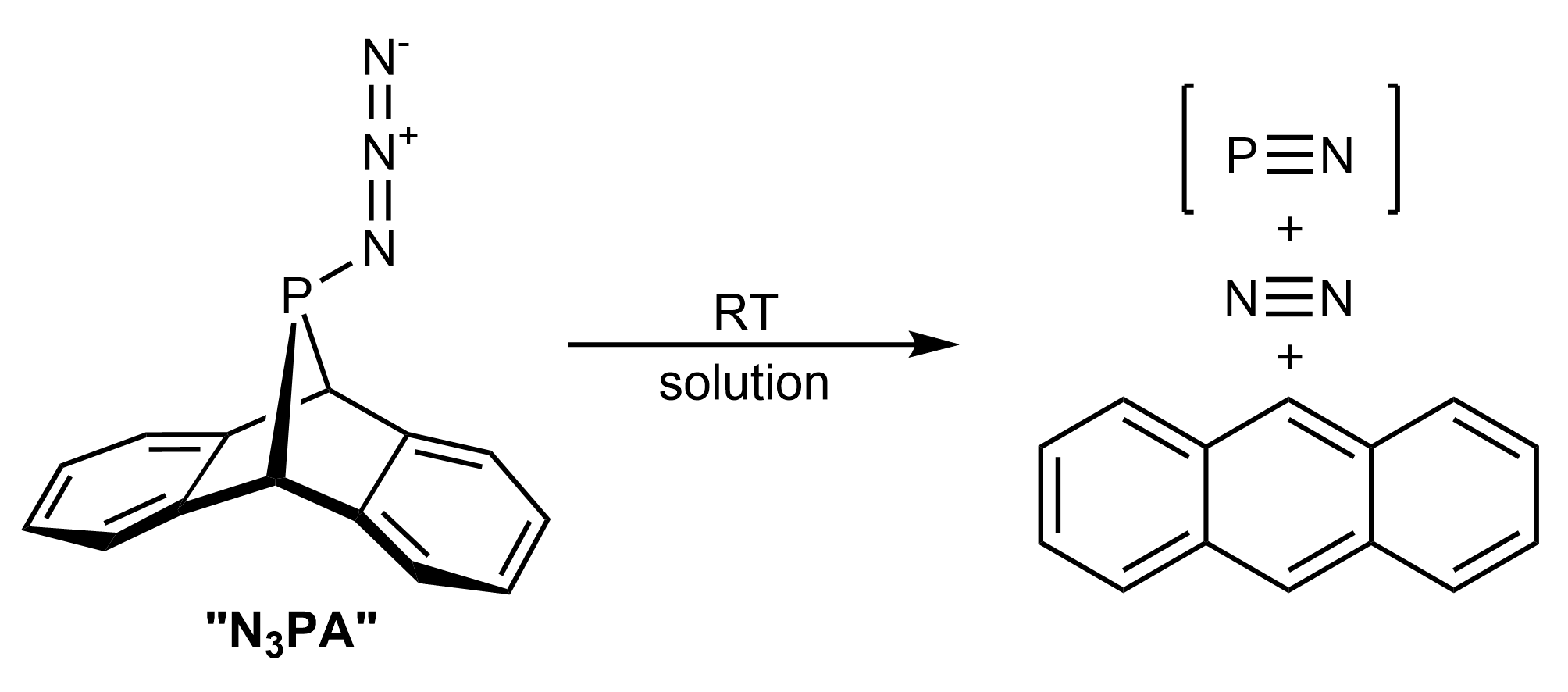
Room temperature PN release reagent, N_{3}PA, from Cummins and coworkers.

The aforementioned methods require very high temperatures which are incompatible with standard, homogeneous solution state chemistry.

In 2022, Cummins and coworkers prepared and isolated a molecular PN precursor, N_{3}PA which rapidly decomposes to N_{2}, anthracene, and PN in solution at room temperature (t_{½} = 30 minutes). With the combination of vacuum and heating to 42 °C, this dissociation is explosive.

== Reactivity ==
Reactions of phosphorus mononitride with other molecules are rare and rather difficult to carry out. The formation of the intermediate (PN)_{3} trimer (which itself is only isolated in matrices) is highly favorable:

3PN ⇌ (PN)_{3} (-334 +/- 60 kJ/mol)

PN generated in both the gaseous phase or in solution that is not subjected to trapping via noble gas matrices or particular metal complexes results in rapid self polymerization even in cases where trapping agents such as dienes or alkynes are present (differentiating its reactivity profile from related molecules such as P_{2}).

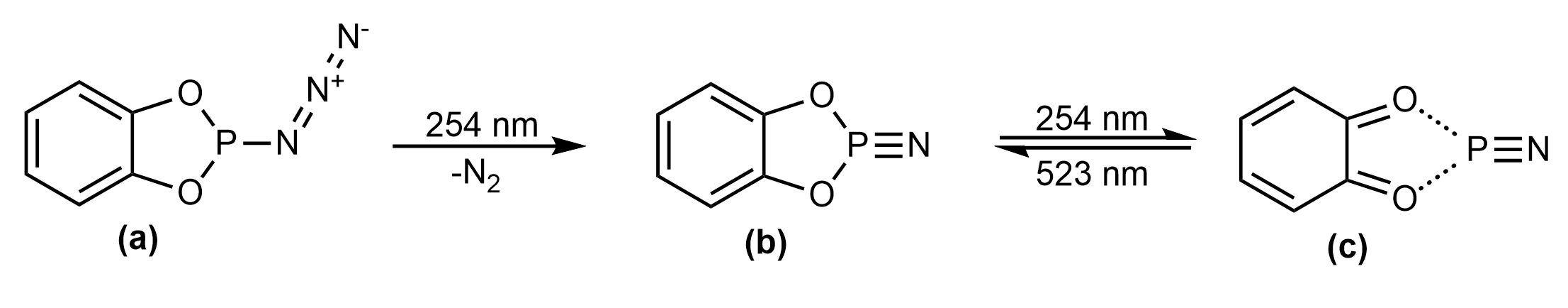
Light driven reversible PN oxidation to a phosphinonitrene at 10 K from Qian et al.

Phosphorus mononitride's tendency to rapidly polymerize with itself has dominated its reactivity, greatly hindering both the study and diversity of products in its reactions with organic molecules.

In 2023, a rare case of documented reactivity with an organic molecule was reported by Qian and coworkers who demonstrated reversible photoisomerization between o-benzoquinone supported phosphinonitrene and o-benzoquinone stabilized phosphorus mononitride at 10 K, which can be isolated in an argon matrix.

=== Ligation, stabilization, and reactivity at transition metals ===
The majority of documented well-defined PN reactivity has been carried out at transition metal centers. The electronic and molecular orbital similarities it shares with N_{2} make it a viable ligating species. While free PN is unstable, phosphorus mononitride has been prepared at metal coordination sites where it can exist as an isolable terminal ligand within a complex. In alternative cases, PN ligands can also exist as only as transient, highly reactive intermediates featuring rich chemistry. As a terminal ligand, cases of both preferential P and N bonding modes have been discovered.

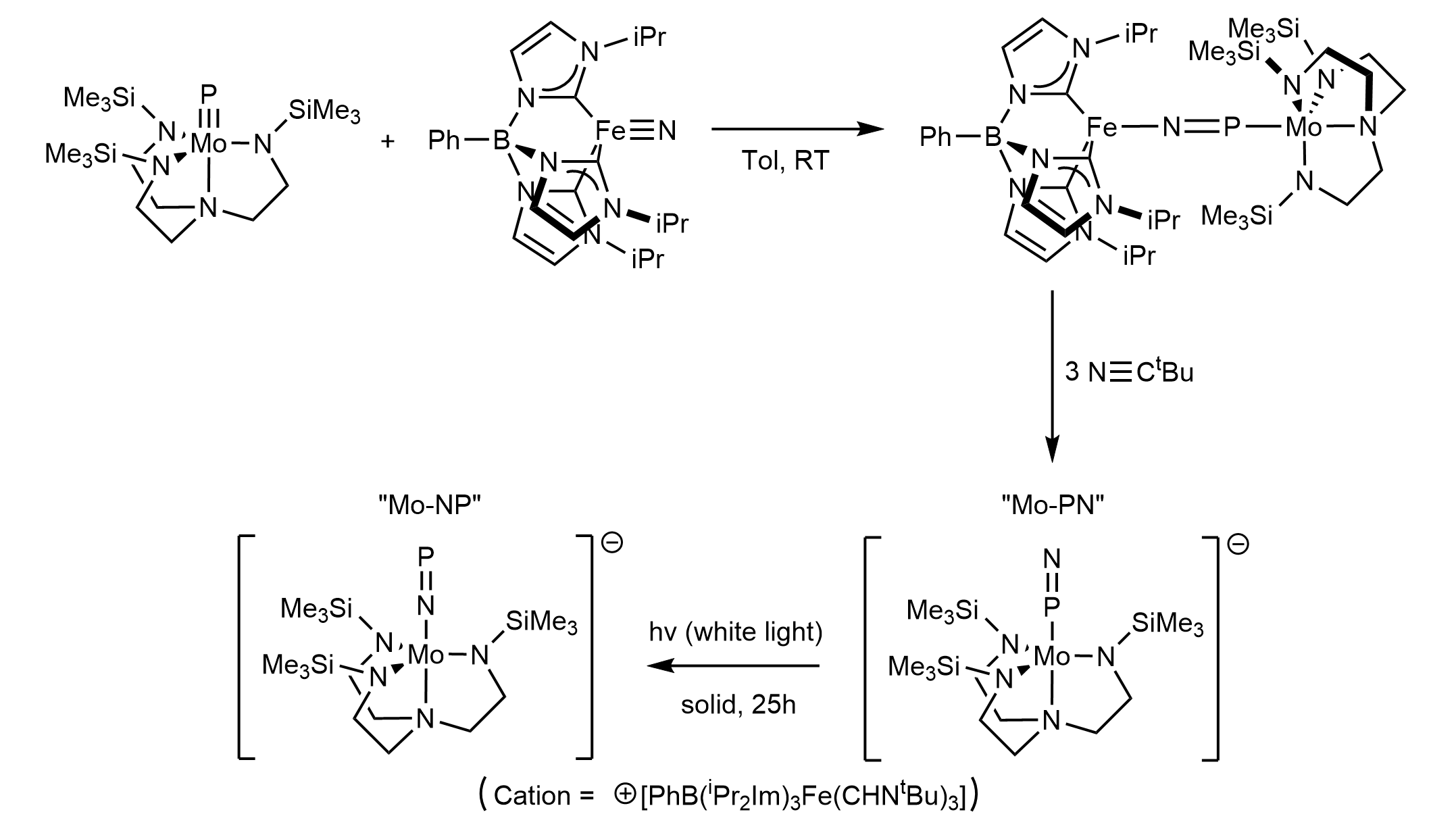
[MoPN]^{−} and [MoNP]^{−} preparation and photoisomerization from Smith and coworkers.

Smith and co-workers isolated the first stable M-PN (and M-NP) complexes, using methodology to generate the PN moiety at metal sites. They reacted a tris(amido) Mo(VI) terminal phosphide complex with a tris(carbene)borate Fe(IV) terminal nitride, which undergo reductive coupling to form the corresponding neutral bridging PhB(^{i}Pr_{2}Im)_{3}Fe-NP-Mo(N_{3}N) complex. Notably, the Mo-N-P bond angle in the bridging compound is nearly perfectly linear with an N-P bond length of 1.509(6) Å (only slightly elongated from free PN indicating significant multiple bond character). Addition of 3 equivalents of strongly lewis basic tert-butyl isocyanide results in the release of the iron adduct as a [PhB(^{i}Pr_{2}Im)_{3}Fe-(CNtBu)_{3}]^{+} cation in the second coordination sphere. The corresponding terminal linear Mo-PN anion can be isolated and converted to its linear Mo-NP isomer by exposure to white light in the solid state. The M-NP isomer of the ligand was determined to be more pi-acidic (N-P = 1.5913(1) Å and P-N = 1.5363(1) Å) and more thermodynamically stable than its isomer.

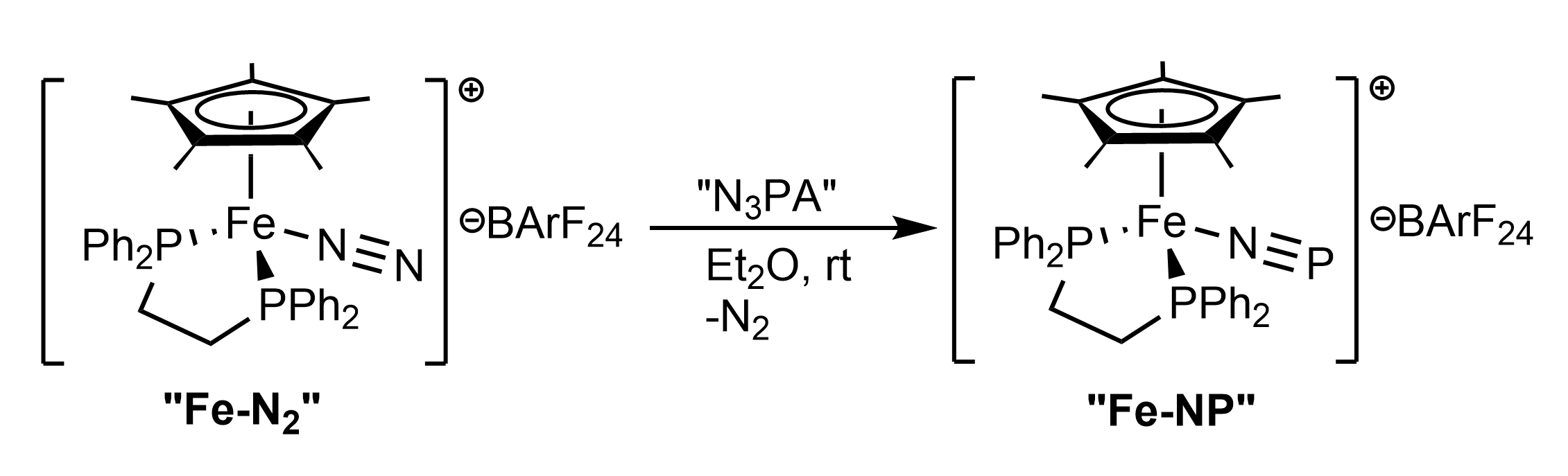
Diamagnetic iron-NP complex from N_{3}PA precursor.

Cummins and co-workers exploited their N_{3}PA free PN releasing reagent to "trap" and isolate a stable terminal (dppe)(Cp*)Fe-NP complex as a BArF_{24} salt. The NP bond length in this case was very short at 1.493(2) Å, almost unperturbed from gaseous PN, which is consistent with minimal pi-backbonding from the iron center. Studies confirmed the NP binding mode (as opposed to PN) to be energetically preferred by 36.6 kcal/mol (153 kJ/mol) in this iron complex, creating a significant barrier to isomerization (thought to arise from Pauli repulsion effects). Studies of phosphorus mononitride chemistry at tris(amido) vanadium complexes undertaken by Cummins and coworkers provides the bulk of PN reactivity examples at transition metals to date. In this system, PN is synthetically generated at a vanadium center from respective dibenzo-7λ^{3} -phosphanorbornadiene derivative precursors. However, it is not stable as a terminal ligand, and instead immediately undergoes trimerization. Notably, a thermodynamic equilibrium exists between this trimer species, along with a dimer and non-observed monomeric intermediate fragment.

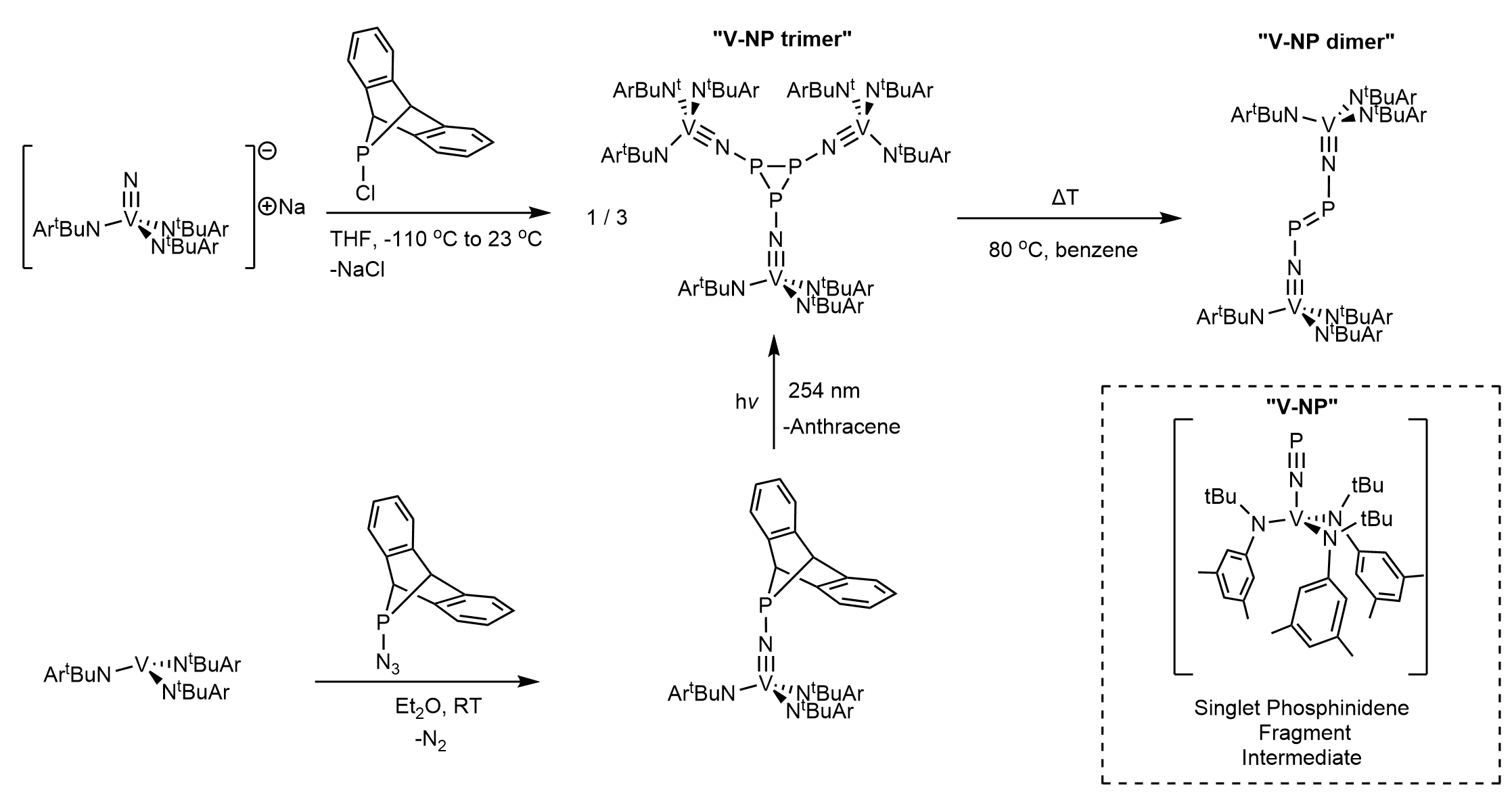
Synthesis of tris(amido) vanadium PN trimer, dimer, and corresponding monomeric V-NP reactive intermediate from Cummins and coworkers.

The V-NP fragment undergoes singlet phosphinidene reactivity ([2+1] additions) with alkene and alkyne trapping agents, generating phosphiranes and phospherenes respectively. The products generated from such additions exist in equilibrium (in the case with cis-4-octene and bis-trimethylsilylacetylene), where retention of the cis-4-octene conformer is observed. Upon heating, they reversibly add to generate the V-NP dimer. Such reactivity demonstrates stark contrasts from P_{2} as a ligand which instead undergoes formal cycloaddition chemistry.

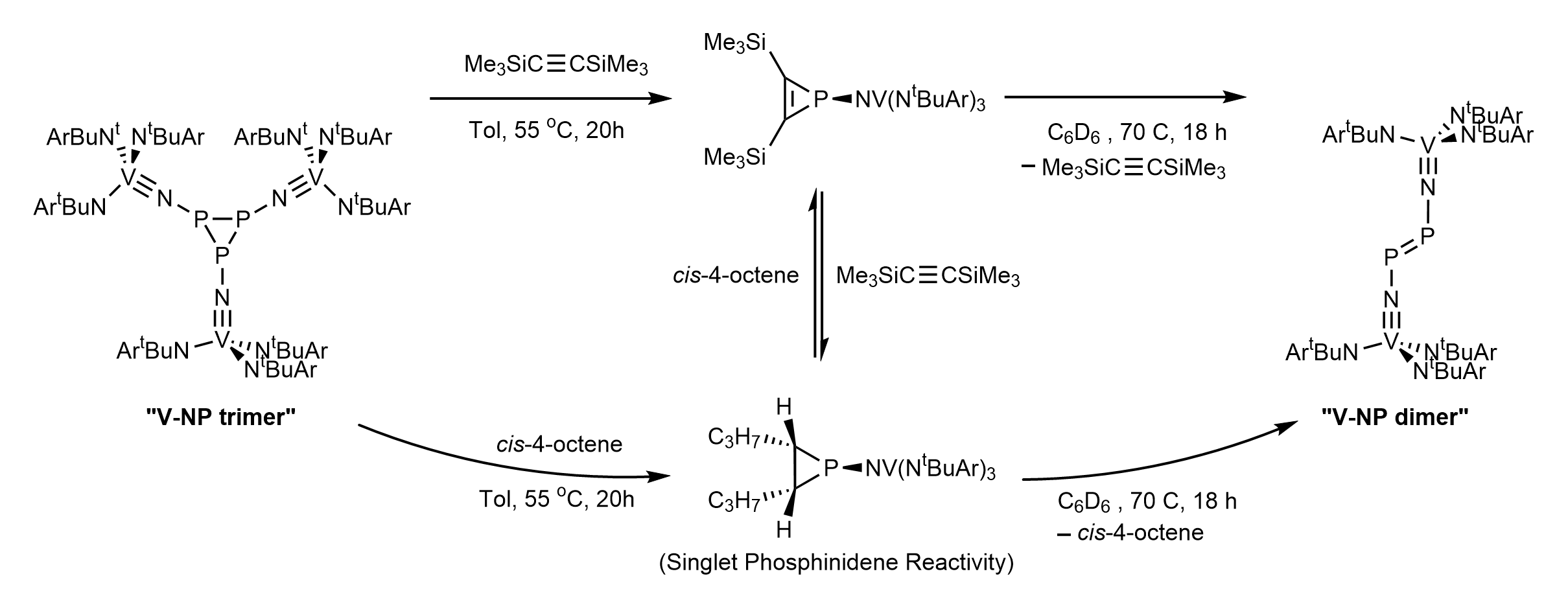
Reactivity of PN generated at vanadium tris(amido) complexes. Reversible singlet phosphinidene reactivity and equilibrium.

== Applications ==
The robust nature of PN reaction products such as (PN)_{n}, could find use in heat resistant ceramics or as fire suppressing materials.

There has long been interest in studying PN and its reaction products like (PN)_{n} polymers, noting their relevance to precursors/intermediates in the production of fertilizers.

== See also ==
- Triphosphorus pentanitride
- Phosphorus monoxide
- Diphosphorus
- Carbon monosulfide
- Silicon monoxide
