= Nitridophosphate =

Class of inorganic chemical compounds

A nitridophosphate is an inorganic compound that contains nitrogen bound to a phosphorus atom, considered as replacing oxygen in a phosphate.

Anions include NPN PN_{3} P_{3}N_{6}. Related compounds include the oxonitridophosphates imidonitridophosphates, nitridoborophosphates, and nitridosilicatephosphates. By changing the phosphorus, related materials include nitridovanadates and nitridorhenates.

Nitridophosphate compounds include elements from the alkali metals, alkaline earths, first row transition metals, rare earth elements, and some other main group elements.

== Characteristics ==
Nitridophosphate compounds nearly always contain phosphorus in tetrahedral configuration. They can be characterised by the condensation index K which is the ratio of numbers of phosphorus tetrahedral centres to nitrogen vertices. As more nitrogen atoms are shared between phosphorus, condensation increases. The maximum is for P_{3}N_{5} which no longer has any capacity for cations. For K of 1/2 three dimensional frameworks are produced. For 2/7 or 3/7 layered arrangements of tetrahedra are produced. For 1/3 chains or ring structures are prominent. 1/4 is for uncondensed PN_{4} compounds. Tow PN_{4} tetrahedra can also share an edge: P_{2}N_{6}, as the P-N bond is not very polarised, so there is less electrostatic repulsion. Uncondensed compounds are sensitive to air and water but highly condensed compounds are water or acid stable.

Nitridophosphate compounds are usually insulators and are transparent to light.

== Formation ==
Heating P_{3}N_{5} with a metal nitride at gigapascal pressure and a temperatures of over 1000 °C forms nitridophosphates. P_{3}N_{5} decomposes over 850 °C at ambient pressure. However there are a few nitridophosphates that do no require such high temperatures to form.

Heating ammonia under pressure with red phosphorus, and metals, metal nitrides or metal azides is a method called ammonothermal synthesis.

== Use ==
Nitridophosphates are under investigation as luminescent materials, that can covert blue light into red.

== List ==
formula	system	space group	unit cell	volume	density	comment	reference
HPN_{2}	tetragonal	I4̅2d	a = 4.6182 c = 7.0204 Z = 4				
HPN_{3}							
β-HP_{4}N_{7}	monoclinic	C2/c	a = 12.873 b = 4.6587 c = 8.3222 β = 102.351° Z = 4	487.55	3.037	colourless	
γ-HP_{4}N_{7}	monoclinic	C2/c	a=6.82983 b=7.24537 c=8.96504 β = 111.5557° Z = 4	412.604	3.572	high pressure form > 12 GPa; P in trigonal bipyramid	
LiPN_{2}							
Li_{7}PN_{4}	cubic	P43n	a=9.3648 Z=8			tetrahedra	
β-Li_{10}P_{4}N_{10}	trigonal		a=8.71929 c=21.4656 Z=6	1413.3	2.35015	colourless; tetrahedron of 4 tetrahedra	
α-Li_{10}P_{4}N_{10}	cubic					>80 °C	
Li_{5}P_{2}N_{5}	monoclinic	C2/c	a=14.770 b=17.850 c=4.860 β =93.11°			layered, high pressure	
Li_{4}PN_{3}	orthorhombic	Pccn	a=9.6597 b=11.8392 c=4.8674			chains	
Li_{12}P_{3}N_{9}	monoclinic	Cc	a=12.094 b=7.649 c=9.711 β=90.53°			ring of 3 tetrahedra	
Li_{18}P_{6}N_{16}	monoclinic	P1̅	a=5.4263 b=7.5354 c=9.8584 α=108.481° β=99.288° γ=104.996° Z=1	355.8	2.496	tricyclic	
Li_{13}P_{4}N_{10}Cl_{3}	cubic	Fm3̅m	a=13.Z=8 Z=8	2704.27	2.2624	colourless;	
Li_{13}P_{4}N_{10}Br_{3}	cubic	Fm3̅m	a=14.1096 Z=8	2809.0	2.8088	colourless;	
LiP_{4}N_{7}	orthorhombic	P2_{1}2_{1}2_{1}	a=4.5846 b=8.009 c=13.252 Z=4	485.8	3.130	air stable; grey	
Li_{1.34}P_{6}N_{9.34}(NH)_{1.66}	monoclinic	P1̅	a=4.691 b=7.024 c=12.736, α=87.73° β=80.28° γ=70.55° Z=2	390.0	2.988	air stable; grey	
BeP_{2}N_{4}	cubic	Fd3̅	a=7.1948 Z=8	372.44		bulk modulus 325 GPa	
BP_{3}N_{6}	monoclinic	P2_{1}/c	a=5.027 b=4.5306 c=17.332 β=106.387° Z=4	378.7	3.293		
Li_{47}B_{3}P_{14}N_{42}	trigonal	P3c1	a=19.3036 c=18.0200				
NaPN_{2}							
NaP_{4}N_{7}							
Na_{3}P_{6}N_{11}							
Mg_{2}PN_{3}	orthorhombic	Cmc2_{1}	a=9.723 b=5.6562 c=4.7083			band gap 5.0 eV	
MgP_{8}N_{14}	orthorhombic		a=8.364 b=5.0214 c=23.196	974.3	3.192		
AlP_{6}N_{11}	monoclinic	Cm	a=4.935 b=8.161 c=9.040 β=98.63°			grey; layered; thermal expansion 16.0 ppm/K	
Ca_{2}PN_{3}	orthorhombic	Cmca	a = 5.1914 b =10.3160 c = 11.289 Z = 8			beige; chains	
CaP_{8}N_{14}							
Sc_{5}P_{12}N_{23}O_{3}	tetragonal	I4_{1}/acd	a=12.3598 c=24.0151 Z=8	3668.6	3.500	grey	
TiP_{4}N_{8}	orthorhombic	Pmn2_{1}	a=7.6065 b=4.6332 c=7.8601 Z=2	227.01	3.403		
TiP_{4}N_{8}	orthorhombic	Pmn2_{1}	a=22.9196 b=4.5880 c=8.0970 Z=6	851.44	3.322		
Ti_{5}P_{12}N_{24}O_{2}	tetragonal	I4_{1}/acd	a=a=12.1214 c=23.8458 Z=8	3503.6	3.713	black; Ti^{3+} & Ti^{4+}	
MnP_{2}N_{4}	hexagonal	P6_{3}22	a = 16.5543 c = 7.5058	1781.3			
FeP_{8}N_{14}	orthorhombic	Cmca	a=8.2693 = 5.10147 c=23.0776			air stable	
CoP_{8}N_{14}	orthorhombic	Cmca	a=8.25183 b=5.10337 c=22.9675			air stable	
NiP_{8}N_{14}	orthorhombic	Cmca	a=8.23105 b=5.08252 c=22.8516			air stable	
CuPN_{2}	tetragonal	I4̅2d	a = 4.5029 c = 7.6157	154.42		band gap 1.67 eV	
Zn_{2}PN_{3}	orthorhombic	Cmc2_{1}	a = 9.37847 b = 5.47696 c = 4.92396 Z = 4			colourless	
Zn_{8}P_{12}N_{24}O_{2}	tetragonal	I4̅3m	a=8.24239 c=8.24239				
Zn_{8}P_{12}N_{24}S_{2}							
Zn_{8}P_{12}N_{24}Se_{2}							
Zn_{8}P_{12}N_{24}Te_{2}							
Zn_{7}P_{12}N_{24}Cl_{2}						sodalite structure	
GeP_{2}N_{4}	orthorhombic	Pna2_{1}	a=9.547 b=7.542 c=4.6941 Z=4			dark grey	
Sr_{3}P_{3}N_{7}	monoclinic	P2/c	a=6.882 b=7.416 c=7.036 β=104.96° Z=2	346.9	4.345	white; decompose in moist air; band gap 4.4 eV	
Sr_{2}SiP_{2}N_{6}	orthorhombic	C222_{1}	a = 6.0849 b = 8.8203 c = 10.2500				
SrP_{8}N_{14}							
SrP_{3}N_{5}NH	monoclinic	P2_{1}/c	a=5.01774 b=8.16912 c=12.70193 β=101.7848° Z=4				
SrH_{4}P_{6}N_{12}							
Sr_{5}Si_{2}P_{6}N_{16}	orthorhombic	Pbam	a = 9.9136 b = 17.5676 c = 8.3968				
SrAl_{5}P_{4}N_{10}O_{2}F_{3}	tetragonal	I4̅m2	a=11.1685 c=7.8485 Z=2	978.99	3.905		
Sr_{3}P_{5}N_{10}Cl	orthorhombic	Pnma	a=12.240 b=12.953 c=13.427 Z=8				
Sr_{3}P_{5}N_{10}Br	orthorhombic	Pnma	a=12.297 b=12.990 c=13.458 Z=8				
AgPN_{2}							
CdP_{2}N_{4}	hexagonal	P6_{3}22	a = 16.7197 c = 7.6428	1850.3			
InP_{6}N_{11}						grey; layered	
BaP_{2}N_{4}							
Ba_{3}P_{5}N_{10}Cl	orthorhombic	Pnma					
Ba_{3}P_{5}N_{10}Br	orthorhombic	Pnma					
BaSr_{2}P_{6}N_{12}	cubic	Pa3̅	a=10.0639 Z=4	1019.3	4.343		
La_{2}P_{3}N_{7}	monoclinic	C2/c					
Ce_{2}P_{3}N_{7}	monoclinic	C2/c					
Ce_{4}Li_{3}P_{18}N_{35}	hexagonal	P6_{3}/m	a=13.9318 c=8.1355				
Pr_{2}P_{3}N_{7}	monoclinic	C2/c	a = 7.8006 b = 10.2221 c = 7.7798 β = 111.299° Z = 4				
Nd_{2}P_{3}N_{7}		P4̅2_{1}m					
LiNdP_{4}N_{8}	orthorhombic	Pnma	a=8.7305 b=7.8783 c=9.0881				
Sm_{2}P_{3}N_{7}		P4̅2_{1}m					
Eu_{2}P_{3}N_{7}		P4̅2_{1}m					
Ho_{2}P_{3}N_{7}		P4̅2_{1}m	a = 7.3589 c = 4.9986 Z = 2				
Ho_{3}[PN_{4}]O	tetragonal	I4/mcm	a = 6.36112 c = 10.5571 Z = 4				
Yb_{2}P_{3}N_{7}		P4̅2_{1}m					
Hf_{9−x}P_{24}N_{52−4x}O_{4x} (x≈1.84)		I4_{1}/acd	a=12.4443 c=23.7674 Z=4	3680.6			
