= Antimony nitride =

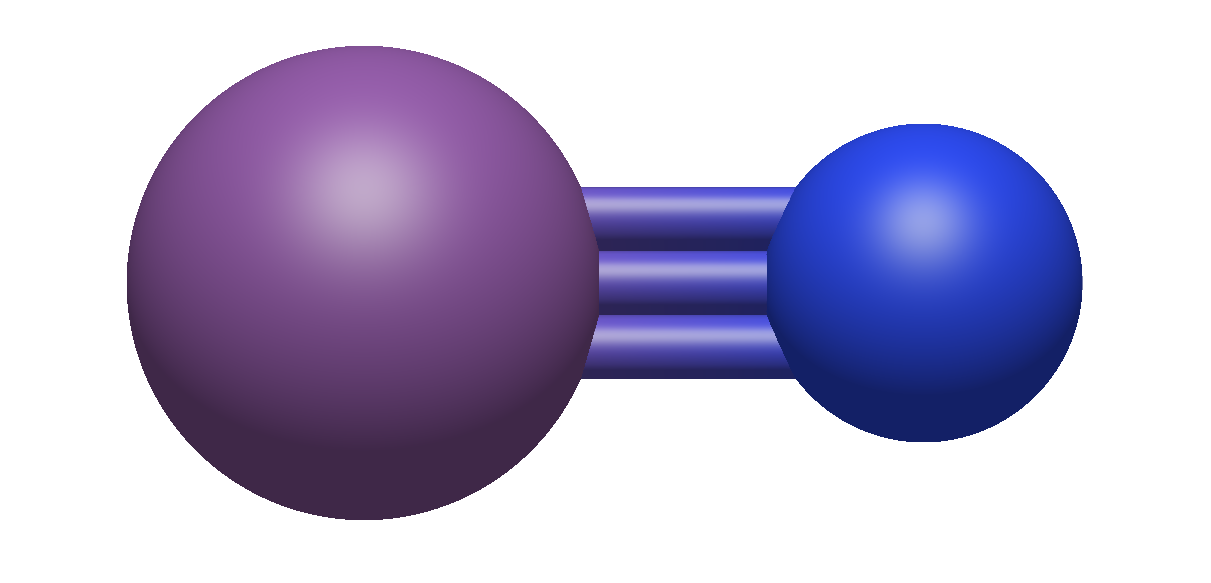

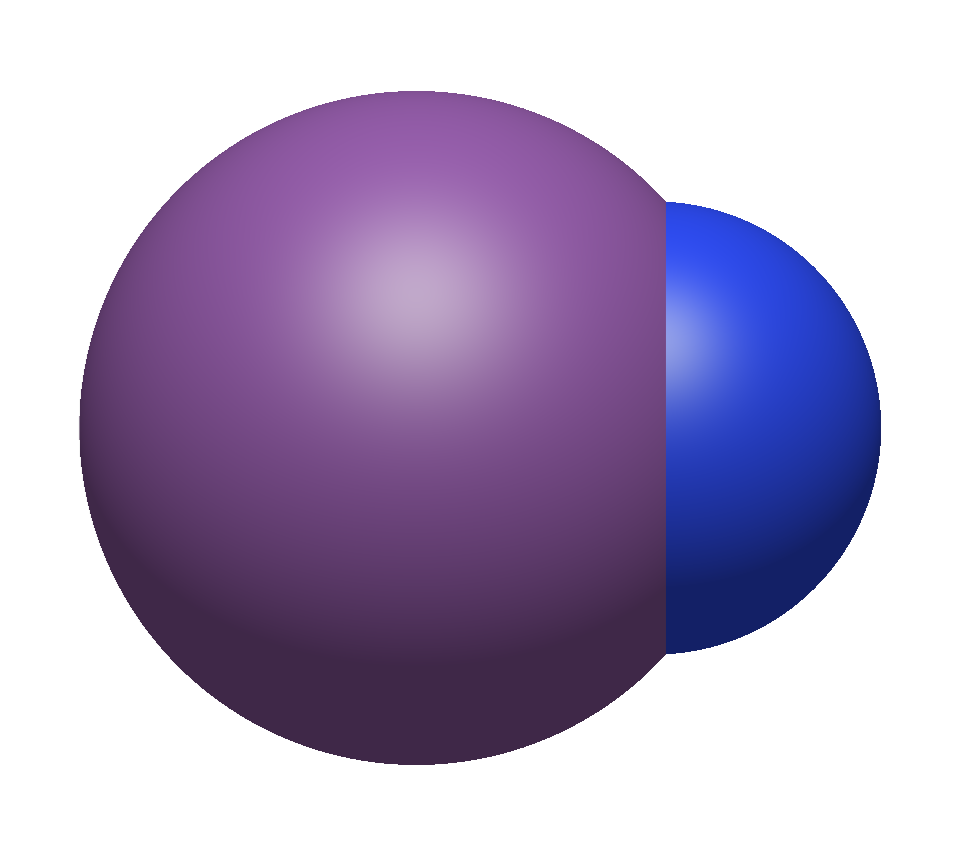

Names
- IUPAC name Azanylidynestibane
- Other names Antimony mononitride Antimony(III) nitride

Identifiers
CAS Number	12333-57-2
3D model (JSmol)	Interactive image
ChemSpider	129549166
PubChem CID	72720468
CompTox Dashboard (EPA)	DTXSID501047745
- InChI: InChI=1S/N.Sb Key: IBKBIJITWRZZBB-UHFFFAOYSA-N
- SMILES: N#[Sb]

Properties
Chemical formula	SbN
Molar mass	135.767 g/mol
- Except where otherwise noted, data are given for materials in their standard state (at 25 °C [77 °F], 100 kPa). Infobox references

Antimony nitride, also called antimony mononitride, is an inorganic compound with the chemical formula SbN. Containing only antimony and nitrogen, this binary nitride material is an interpnictogen. It is the antimony analog of phosphorus mononitride.

Antimony nitride forms when antimony trichloride dissolves in liquid ammonia.

It has been investigated as a transparent film that conducts electricity.

== See also ==
- Phosphorus mononitride
