= Diphosphorus =

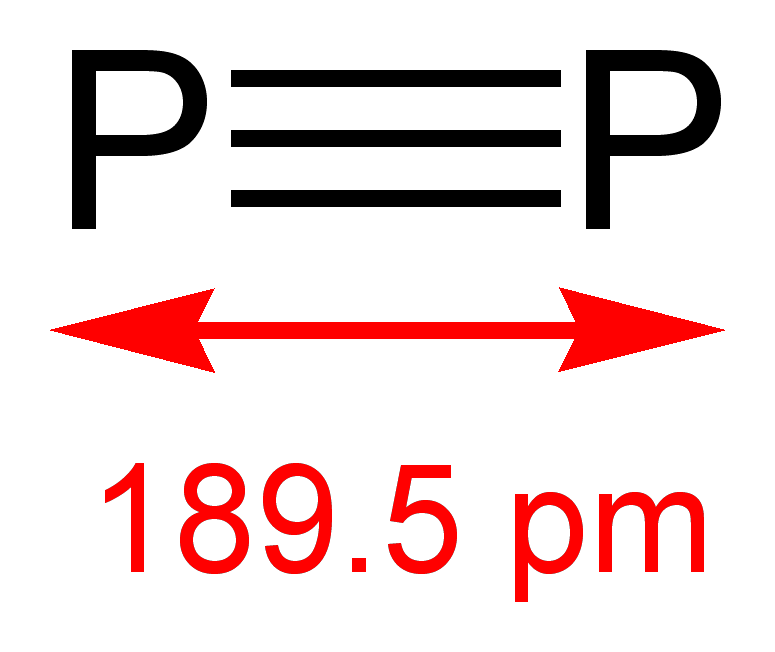
Stick model of diphosphorus
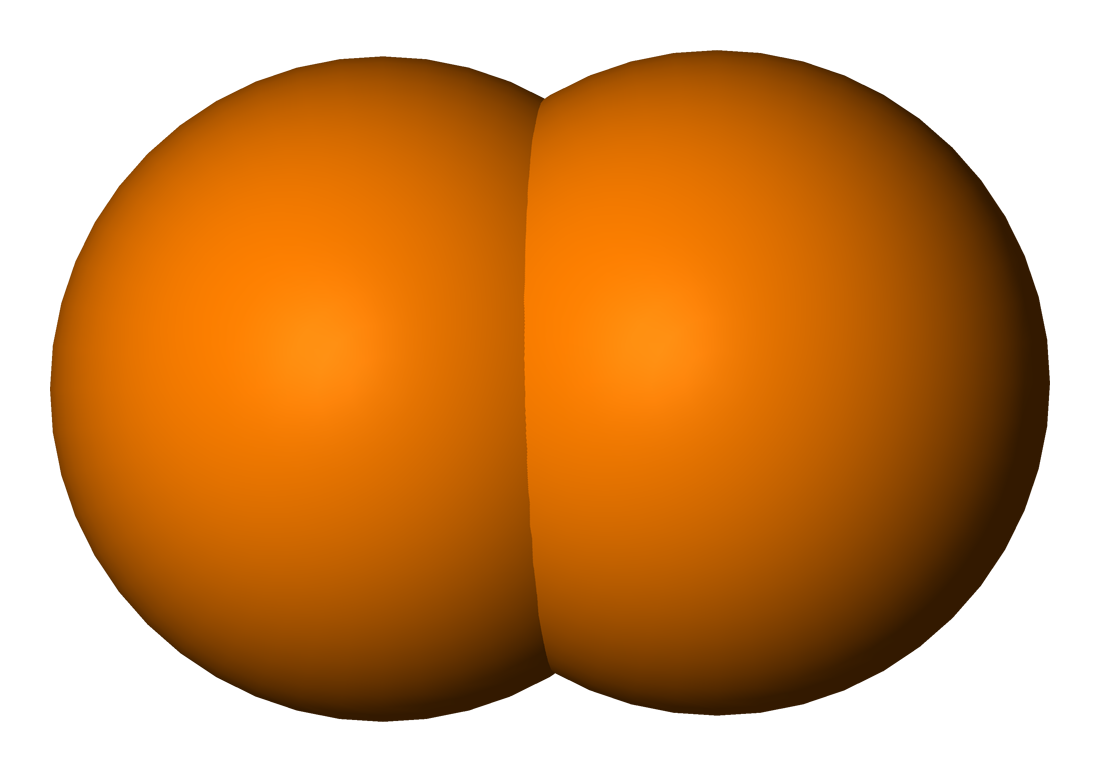
Spacefill model of diphosphorus

Names
- IUPAC name Diphosphorus
- Systematic IUPAC name Diphosphyne

Identifiers
| CAS Number | 12185-09-0 |
| 3D model (JSmol) | Interactive image |
| ChEBI | CHEBI:33472 |
| ChemSpider | 4574176 |
| Gmelin Reference | 1400241 |
| PubChem CID | 5460700 |
| CompTox Dashboard (EPA) | DTXSID301027109 |
- InChI: InChI=1S/P2/c1-2 Key: FOBPTJZYDGNHLR-UHFFFAOYSA-N; InChI=1/P2/c1-2 Key: FOBPTJZYDGNHLR-UHFFFAOYAU
- SMILES: P#P

Properties
| Chemical formula | P_{2} |
| Molar mass | 61.947523996 g·mol^{−1} |
- Except where otherwise noted, data are given for materials in their standard state (at 25 °C [77 °F], 100 kPa). verify (what is ?) Infobox references

Diphosphorus is an inorganic chemical with the chemical formula P_{2}. Unlike nitrogen, its lighter pnictogen neighbor which forms a stable N_{2} molecule with a nitrogen to nitrogen triple bond, phosphorus prefers a tetrahedral form P_{4} because P-P pi-bonds are high in energy. Diphosphorus is, therefore, very reactive with a bond-dissociation energy (117 kcal/mol or 490 kJ/mol) half that of dinitrogen. The bond distance has been measured at 1.8934 Å.

== Synthesis ==
Diphosphorus has been generated by heating white phosphorus at 1100 kelvins (827 °C). Nevertheless, some advancements have been obtained in generating the diatomic molecule in homogeneous solution under normal conditions with the use of some transition metal complexes (based on, for example, tungsten and niobium). Methods for dissociation of bonds in P_{4} molecules via photoexcitation were also proposed.

The molecule attracted attention in 2006, when a new method for its synthesis at milder temperatures emerged. This method is a variation on nitrogen expulsion in azides with formation of a nitrene. The synthesis of the diphosphorus precursor consists of reacting a terminal niobium phosphide with a chloroiminophosphane:

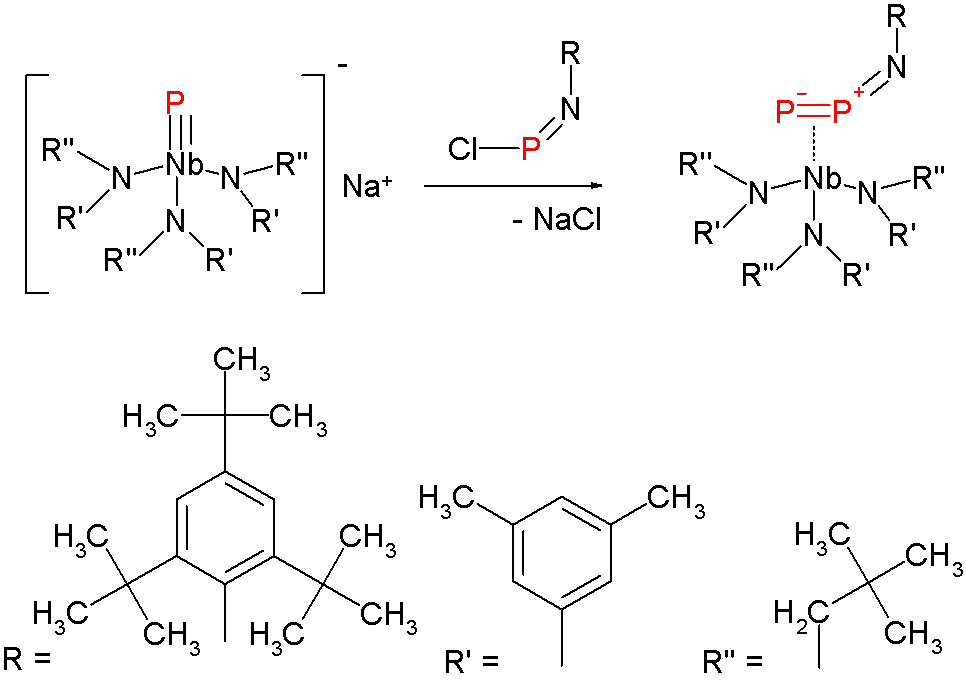

Heating this compound at 50 °C in 1,3-cyclohexadiene serving as a solvent and as a trapping reagent expels diphosphorus, which is reactive, as the end products are a double Diels–Alder adduct and the niobium imido compound:

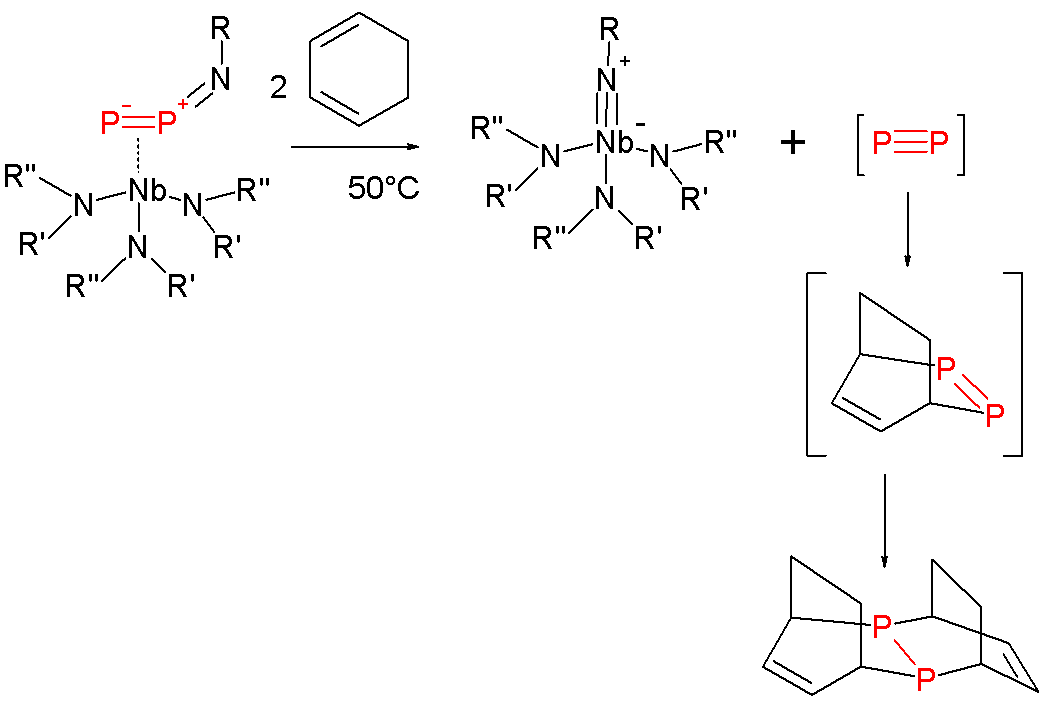

The same imido compound also forms when the thermolysis is performed in toluene, but in this case the fate of the diphosphorus is unknown.

P_{2} has been suggested to form as an intermediate in the photolysis of P_{4}, and in the presence of 2,3-dimethyl-1,3-butadiene the diphosphane resulting from Diels–Alder addition is again formed. To date, no direct evidence of P_{2} formation via P_{4} photolysis exists.

The generation of diphosphorus from a diphosphorus bisanthracene adduct has been reported. The synthesis of a stabilized HP_{2}^{+} cation has been reported.
