= L1157 =

Dark nebula in the constellation Cepheus

L 1157
Dark nebula
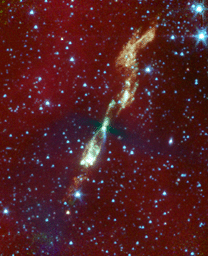

Observation data: J2000 epoch
- Right ascension: 20^{h} 39.5^{m}
- Declination: +68° 00.7′
- Distance: 1,400 ly (440 pc)
- Constellation: Cepheus

L 1157 is a dark nebula in the constellation Cepheus. It was catalogued in 1962 by U.S. astronomer Beverly T. Lynds in her Catalogue of Dark Nebulae, becoming the 1157th entry in the table; hence the designation. It includes protostars that are ejecting material in bipolar outflows, forming bow shocks in the surrounding ambient gas. Formamide and HCNO have been detected in these shocked regions, among other compounds.
