= Triphosphorus pentanitride =

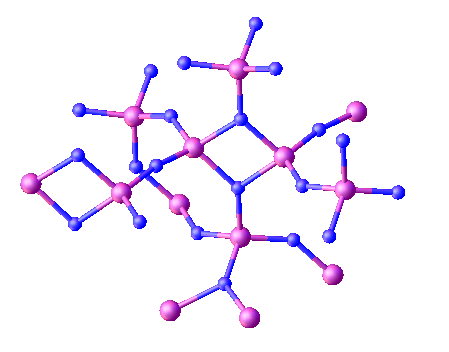

Names
- IUPAC name Triphosphorus pentanitride
- Other names Phosphorus(V) nitride, Phosphorus nitride

Identifiers
CAS Number	12136-91-3
3D model (JSmol)	Interactive image; Interactive image
ChemSpider	52564232
ECHA InfoCard	100.032.018
EC Number	235-233-9
PubChem CID	15443112
CompTox Dashboard (EPA)	DTXSID6093968
- InChI: InChI=1S/N5P3/c1-6-2-8-3-7(1,4(6)8)5(6)8 Key: WHDABVISSCGTFK-UHFFFAOYSA-N
- SMILES: N#P1N2P(#N)N1P2#N; N1=P23N=P45N2P1(=N4)N35

Properties
Chemical formula	P_{3}N_{5}
Molar mass	162.955 g/mol
Appearance	White solid
Density	2.77 g/cm^{3} (α-P_{3}N_{5})
Melting point	850 °C (1,560 °F; 1,120 K) decomposes
Solubility in water	insoluble
- Except where otherwise noted, data are given for materials in their standard state (at 25 °C [77 °F], 100 kPa). Infobox references

Triphosphorus pentanitride is an inorganic compound with the chemical formula P_{3}N_{5}. Containing only phosphorus and nitrogen, this material is classified as a binary nitride. While it has been investigated for various applications this has not led to any significant industrial uses. It is a white solid, although samples often appear colored owing to impurities.

== Synthesis ==
Triphosphorus pentanitride can be produced by reactions between various phosphorus(V) and nitrogen anions (such as ammonia and sodium azide):

3 PCl_{5} + 5 NH_{3} → P_{3}N_{5} + 15 HCl
3 PCl_{5} + 15 NaN_{3} → P_{3}N_{5} + 15 NaCl + 20 N_{2}

The reaction of the elements is claimed to produce a related material. Similar methods are used to prepared boron nitride (BN) and silicon nitride (Si_{3}N_{4}); however the products are generally impure and amorphous.

Crystalline samples have been produced by the reaction of ammonium chloride and hexachlorocyclotriphosphazene or phosphorus pentachloride.

(NPCl_{2})_{3} + 2 [NH_{4}]Cl → P_{3}N_{5} + 8 HCl
3 PCl_{5} + 5 [NH_{4}]Cl → P_{3}N_{5} + 20 HCl

P_{3}N_{5} has also been prepared at room temperature, by a reaction between phosphorus trichloride and sodium amide.

3 PCl_{3} + 5 NaNH_{2} → P_{3}N_{5} + 5 NaCl + 4 HCl + 3 H_{2}

== Reactions ==
P_{3}N_{5} is thermally less stable than either BN or Si_{3}N_{4}, with decomposition to the elements occurring at temperatures above 850 °C:

P_{3}N_{5} → 3 PN + N_{2}
4 PN → P_{4} + 2 N_{2}

It is resistant to weak acids and bases, and insoluble in water at room temperature, however it hydrolyzes upon heating to form the ammonium phosphate salts [NH_{4}]_{2}HPO_{4} and [NH_{4}]H_{2}PO_{4}.

Triphosphorus pentanitride reacts with lithium nitride and calcium nitride to form the corresponding salts of PN^{7−}_{4} and PN^{4−}_{3}. Heterogenous ammonolyses of triphosphorus pentanitride gives imides such as HPN_{2} and HP_{4}N_{7}. It has been suggested that these compounds may have applications as solid electrolytes and pigments.

== Structure and properties ==
Several polymorphs are known for triphosphorus pentanitride. The alpha‑form of triphosphorus pentanitride (α‑P_{3}N_{5}) is encountered at atmospheric pressure and exists at pressures up to 11 GPa, at which point it converts to the gamma‑variety (γ‑P_{3}N_{5}) of the compound. Upon heating γ‑P_{3}N_{5} to temperatures above 2000 K at pressures between 67 and 70 GPa, it transforms into δ-P_{3}N_{5}. The release of pressure on the δ-P_{3}N_{5} polymorph does not revert it back into γ‑P_{3}N_{5} or α‑P_{3}N_{5}. Instead, at pressures below 7 GPa, δ-P_{3}N_{5} converts into a fourth form of triphosphorus pentanitride, α′‑P_{3}N_{5}.

Polymorph	Density (g/cm^{3})
α‑P_{3}N_{5}	2.77
α′‑P_{3}N_{5}	3.11
γ‑P_{3}N_{5}	3.65
δ‑P_{3}N_{5}	5.27 (at 72 GPa)

The structure of all polymorphs of triphosphorus pentanitride was determined by single crystal X-ray diffraction. α‑P_{3}N_{5} and α′‑P_{3}N_{5} are formed of a network structure of PN_{4} tetrahedra with 2- and 3-coordinated nitrides, γ‑P_{3}N_{5} is composed of both PN_{4} and PN_{5} polyhedra while δ-P_{3}N_{5} is composed exclusively of corner- and edge-sharing PN_{6} octahedra. δ-P_{3}N_{5} is the most incompressible triphosphorus pentanitride, having a bulk modulus of 313 GPa.

== Potential applications ==
Triphosphorus pentanitride has no commercial applications, although it found use as a gettering material for incandescent lamps, replacing various mixtures containing red phosphorus in the late 1960s. The lighting filaments are dipped into a suspension of P_{3}N_{5} prior to being sealed into the bulb. After bulb closure, but while still on the pump, the lamps are lit, causing the P_{3}N_{5} to thermally decompose into its constituent elements. Much of this is removed by the pump but enough P_{4} vapor remains to react with any residual oxygen inside the bulb. Once the vapor pressure of P_{4} is low enough, either filler gas is admitted to the bulb prior to sealing off or, if a vacuum atmosphere is desired, the bulb is sealed off at that point. The high decomposition temperature of P_{3}N_{5} allows sealing machines to run faster and hotter than was possible using red phosphorus.

Related halogen containing cyclic polymers, trimeric hexabromophosphazene (PNBr_{2})_{3} (melting point 192 °C) and tetrameric octabromophosphazene (PNBr_{2})_{4} (melting point 202 °C) find similar lamp gettering applications for tungsten halogen lamps, where they perform the dual processies of gettering and precise halogen dosing.

Triphosphorus pentanitride has also been investigated as a semiconductor for applications in microelectronics, particularly as a gate insulator in metal-insulator-semiconductor devices.

As a fuel in pyrotechnic obscurant mixtures, it offers some benefits over the more commonly used red phosphorus, owing mainly to its higher chemical stability. Unlike red phosphorus, P_{3}N_{5} can be safely mixed with strong oxidizers, even potassium chlorate. While these mixtures can burn up to 200 times faster than state-of-the-art red phosphorus mixtures, they are far less sensitive to shock and friction. Additionally, P_{3}N_{5} is much more resistant to hydrolysis than red phosphorus, giving pyrotechnic mixtures based on it greater stability under long-term storage.

Patents have been filed for the use of triphosphorus pentanitride in fire fighting measures.

== See also ==
- Polyphosphazene
- Phosphorus mononitride
