= Matrix isolation =

Experimental chemistry technique

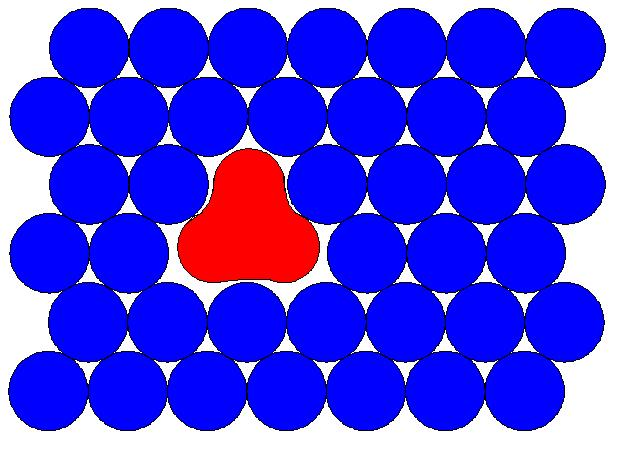
Diagram representing a triangular, guest species (in red) isolated in solid host matrix (in blue).

Matrix isolation is an experimental technique used in chemistry and physics. It generally involves a material being trapped within an unreactive matrix. A host matrix is a continuous solid phase in which guest particles (atoms, molecules, ions, etc.) are embedded. The guest is said to be isolated within the host matrix. Initially the term matrix-isolation was used to describe the placing of a chemical species in any unreactive material, often polymers or resins, but more recently has referred specifically to gases in low-temperature solids. A typical matrix isolation experiment involves a guest sample being diluted in the gas phase with the host material, usually a noble gas or nitrogen. This mixture is then deposited on a window that is cooled to below the melting point of the host gas. The sample may then be studied using various spectroscopic procedures.

== Experimental setup ==
Apparatus for transmission measurements

The transparent window, on to which the sample is deposited, is usually cooled using a compressed helium or similar refrigerant. Experiments must be performed under a high vacuum to prevent contaminants from unwanted gases freezing to the cold window. Lower temperatures are preferred, due to the improved rigidity and "glassiness" of the matrix material. Noble gases such as argon are used not just because of their unreactivity but also because of their broad optical transparency in the solid state. Mono-atomic gases have relatively simple face-centered cubic (fcc) crystal structure, which can make interpretations of the site occupancy and crystal-field splitting of the guest easier. In some cases a reactive material, for example, methane, hydrogen or ammonia, may be used as the host material so that the reaction of the host with the guest species may be studied.

Using the matrix isolation technique, short-lived, highly-reactive species such as radical ions and reaction intermediates may be observed and identified by spectroscopic means. For example, the solid noble gas krypton can be used to form an inert matrix within which a reactive F_{3}^{−} ion can sit in chemical isolation. The reactive species can either be generated outside (before deposition) the apparatus and then be condensed, inside the matrix (after deposition) by irradiating or heating a precursor, or by bringing together two reactants on the growing matrix surface. For the deposition of two species it can be crucial to control the contact time and temperature. In twin jet deposition the two species have a much shorter contact time (and lower temperature) than in merged jet. With concentric jet the contact time is adjustable.

Different deposition techniques

== Spectroscopy ==
Within the host matrix, the rotation and translation of the guest particle is usually inhibited. Therefore, the matrix isolation technique may be used to simulate a spectrum of a species in the gas phase without rotational and translational interference. The low temperatures also help to produce simpler spectra, since only the lower electronic and vibrational quantum states are populated.

Especially infrared (IR) spectroscopy, which is used to investigate molecular vibration, benefits from the matrix isolation technique. For example, in the gas-phase IR spectrum of fluoroethane some spectral regions are very difficult to interpret, as vibrational quantum states heavily overlap with multiple rotational-vibrational quantum states. When fluoroethane is isolated in argon or neon matrices at low temperatures, the rotation of the fluoroethane molecule is inhibited. Because rotational-vibrational quantum states are quenched in the matrix isolation IR spectrum of fluoroethane, all vibrational quantum states can be identified. This is especially useful for the validation of simulated infrared spectra that can be obtained from computational chemistry.

== History ==
Matrix isolation has its origins in the first half of the 20th century with the experiments by photo-chemists and physicists freezing samples in liquefied gases. The earliest isolation experiments involved the freezing of species in transparent, low temperature organic glasses, such as EPA (ether/isopentane/ethanol 5:5:2). The modern matrix isolation technique was developed extensively during the 1950s, in particular by George C. Pimentel. He initially used higher-boiling inert gases like xenon and nitrogen as the host material, and is often said to be the "father of matrix isolation".

Laser vaporization in matrix isolation spectroscopy was first brought about in 1969 by Schaeffer and Pearson using a yttrium aluminum garnet (YAG) laser to vaporize carbon which reacted with hydrogen to produce acetylene. They also showed that laser-vaporized boron would react with HCl to create BCl_{3}. In the 1970s, Koerner von Gustorf's lab used the technique to produce free metal atoms which were then deposited with organic substrates for use in organometallic chemistry. Spectroscopic studies were done on reactive intermediates in around the early 1980s by Bell Labs. They used laser-induced fluorescence to characterize multiple molecules like SnBi and SiC_{2}. Smalley's group employed the use of this method with time-of-flight mass spectrometry by analyzing Al clusters. With the work of chemists like these, laser-vaporization in matrix isolation spectroscopy rose in popularity due to its ability to generate transients involving metals, alloys and semi-conductor molecules and clusters.

== See also ==
- Host–guest chemistry
- Inert gas
- Van der Waals interactions
- Radicals
