= Letts nitrile synthesis =

Chemical reaction

Named after	Edmund A. Letts
Reaction type	Substitution reaction

The Letts nitrile synthesis is a chemical reaction of aromatic carboxylic acids with metal thiocyanates to form nitriles. The reaction includes the loss of carbon dioxide and potassium hydrosulfide. The polar basic substitution reaction was discovered in 1872 by Edmund A. Letts.

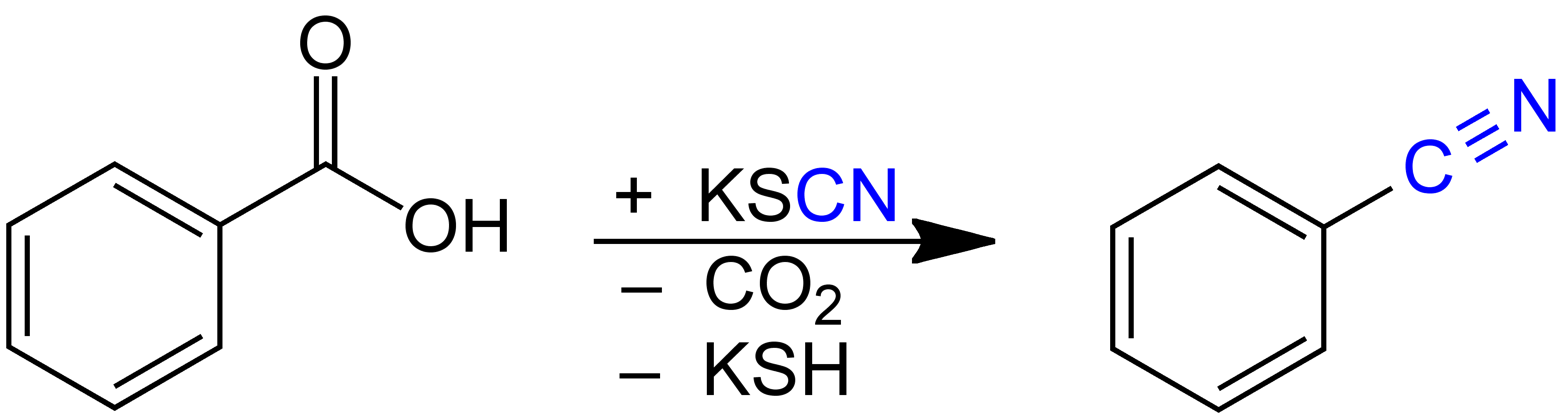
The Letts nitrile synthesis

== History ==
In 1857 Hugo Schiff observed that the reaction between benzoyl chloride with potassium cyanide produced the desired benzonitrile. Work done later by British chemist Edmund A. Letts delved much deeper into the synthesis of nitriles. Attempting first to add cyano-groups to acetic acid, he obtained a mixture of acetamide and carbonyl sulfide. However, in 1872 he showed that treating a 2:1 molecular ratio of benzoic acid and potassium thiocyanate with heat for several hours also produced nitriles with only a small amount of amide with about 40% yield.

G. Krüss expanded on Letts' work in 1884, producing better yields by utilizing lead(II) thiocyanate. In 1916, E.E. Reid found that showed that dry distillation of the zinc(II) salt of the acid with a 20% excess of lead(II) thiocyanate gave an 86% conversion and 91% yield, almost double of that produced by Letts.

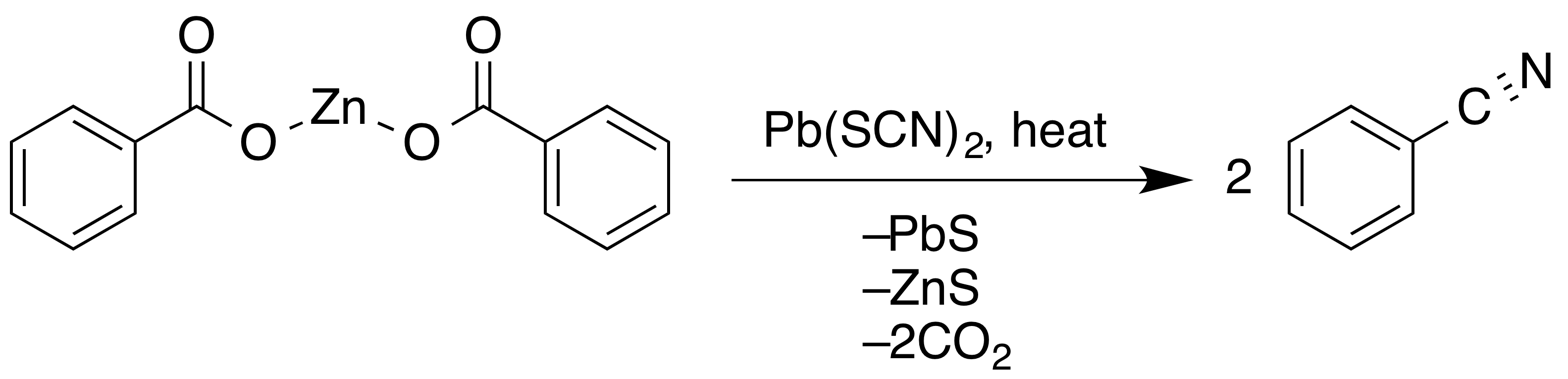
Reid's improvement on the Letts synthesis

== Mechanism ==
Kekulé proposed the reaction mechanism in 1873.

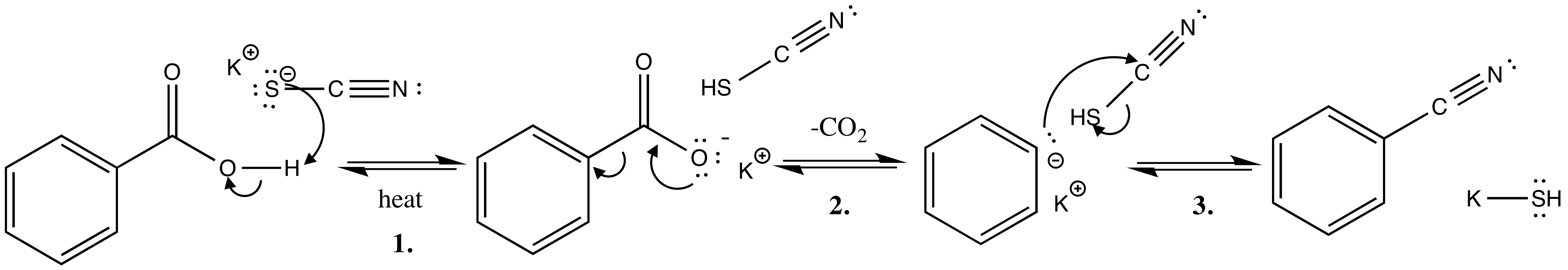
Proposed Mechanism for the Letts Nitrile Synthesis

In this polar basic substitution reaction mechanism, thiocyanate ion extracts the acidic proton from benzoic acid while heated. This yields the conjugate base (stabilized by resonance structures) and thiocyanic acid.

The next step involves the evolution of carbon dioxide, where a lone pair of electrons moves from the negatively charged oxygen to form a double bond with the carboxylic carbon. The sigma bond between the ring and carboxyl group is then severed, the electron pair moving to the ring and delocalized through resonance structures.

The final step of the mechanism involves the attack of the phenyl anion attacking the cyano-carbon, pushing the electron pair over to the sulfur, which readily diffuses the negative charge and is further stabilized by the potassium ion, resulting in the final benzonitrile product and potassium hydrosulfide.

== Applications ==
Aromatic nitriles have a few applications, including polyrecombination to form polymers, are sometimes studied as biologically active molecules and undergoing Ritter reactions to form amides.

Restrosynthesis of Fluvoxamine

Benzonitrile, the original product of Letts, has multiple uses as a versatile reagent and as a solvent. Substituted benzonitriles are important in many fields including pharmaceuticals. Benzonitrile is a precursor in the synthesis of Fadrozole, an aromatase inhibitor used in the treatment of breast cancer. 4-(trifluoromethyl)benzonitrile, produced by the Nickel catalyzed cyanation of 4-chlorobenzotrifluoride is a precursor for the antidepressant Fluvoxamine.

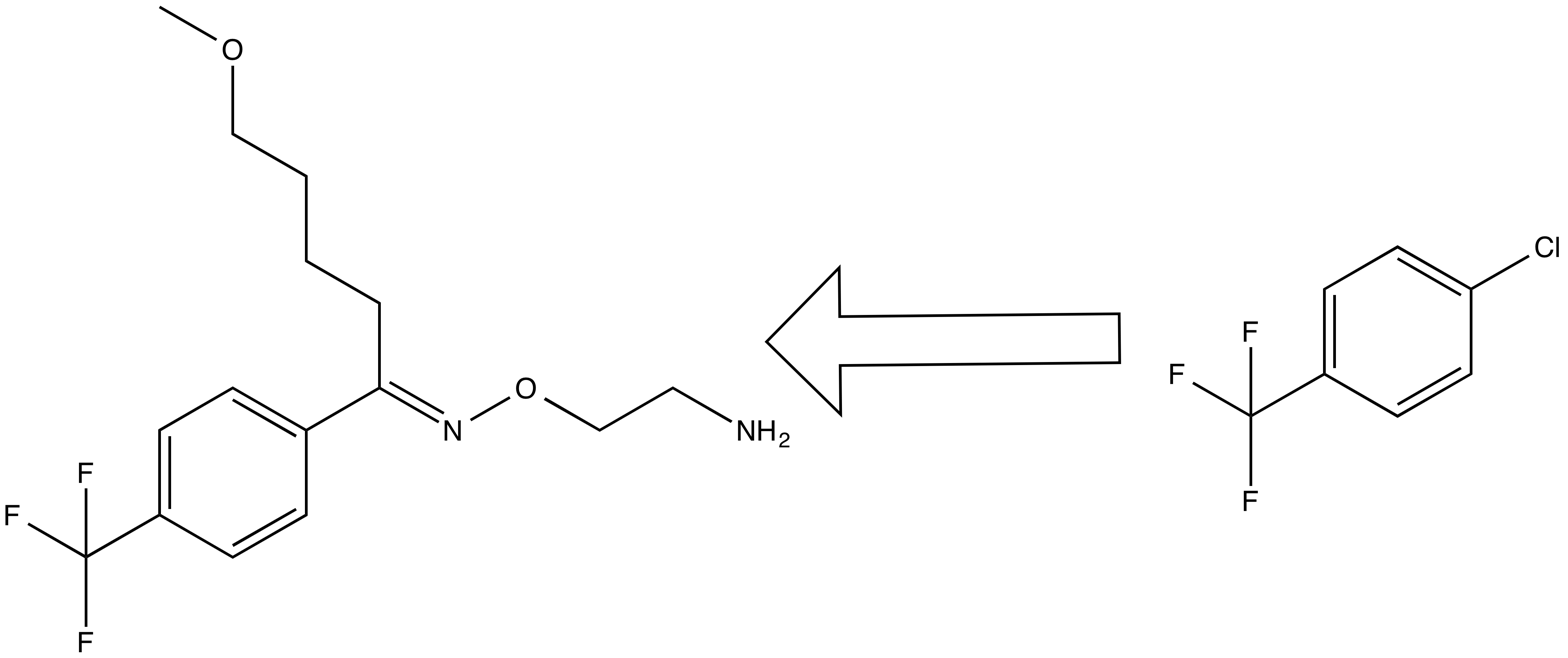
Restrosynthesis of Fluvoxamine

Benzonitrile can also act a ligand in asymmetric catalysis, coordinating to transition metals and forming Lewis acids.

== See also ==
For synthesis of nitriles:

- Kolbe nitrile synthesis
- Rosenmund-von Braun reaction

For reactions of nitriles:

- Pinner reaction
- Stephen aldehyde synthesis
