= Von Braun amide degradation =

Chemical reaction

The von Braun amide degradation is the chemical reaction of a monosubstituted amide with phosphorus pentachloride or thionyl chloride to give a nitrile and an organohalide. It is named after Julius von Braun, who first reported the reaction.

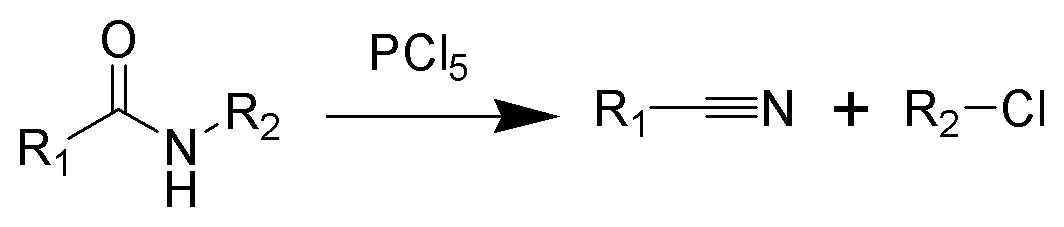
The von Braun amide degradation

== Reaction mechanism ==
The secondary amide 1 reacts via its enolized form with phosphorus pentachloride to form the oxonium ion 2. This produces a chloride ion which deprotonates the oxonium ion to form and imine 3 and hydrogen chloride. These then react with one another to form an amine, with loss of the phosphorus chloride residue. The β-chloroimine 4 is unstable and undergoes internal elimination to a form a nitrilium cation 5 which is cleaved by attack by chloride to form a nitrile 6a and a haloalkane 6b.

== See also ==
- von Braun reaction
- Rosenmund–von Braun reaction
