= Aliphatic nitrilase =

Class of enzymes

aliphatic nitrilase

Identifiers
- EC no.: 3.5.5.7
- CAS no.: 9024-90-2

Databases
- IntEnz: IntEnz view
- BRENDA: BRENDA entry
- ExPASy: NiceZyme view
- KEGG: KEGG entry
- MetaCyc: metabolic pathway
- PRIAM: profile
- PDB structures: RCSB PDB PDBe PDBsum
- Gene Ontology: AmiGO / QuickGO
Search
- PMC: articles
- PubMed: articles
- NCBI: proteins

In enzymology, an aliphatic nitrilase also known as aliphatic nitrile aminohydrolase (EC 3.5.5.7) is an enzyme that catalyzes the hydrolysis of nitriles to carboxylic acids:

R-CN + 2 H_{2}O $\rightleftharpoons$ R-COOH + NH_{3}

Thus, the two substrates of this enzyme are an aliphatic nitrile (R-CN) and H_{2}O, whereas its two products are a carboxylic acid (R-COOH) and NH_{3}.

This enzyme belongs to the family of hydrolases, those acting on carbon-nitrogen bonds other than peptide bonds, specifically in nitriles. This enzyme participates in styrene degradation.
