= Nitrile =

Organic compound with a –C≡N functional group

The structure of a nitrile with the functional group highlighted in blue

In organic chemistry, a nitrile is any organic compound that has a −C≡N functional group. The name of the compound is composed of a base, which includes the carbon of the −C≡N, suffixed with "nitrile", so for example CH_{3}CH_{2}C≡N is called "propionitrile" (or propanenitrile). The prefix cyano- is used interchangeably with the term nitrile in industrial literature. Nitriles are found in many useful compounds, including methyl cyanoacrylate, used in super glue, and nitrile rubber, a nitrile-containing polymer used in latex-free laboratory and medical gloves. Nitrile rubber is also widely used as automotive and other seals since it is resistant to fuels and oils. Organic compounds containing multiple nitrile groups are known as cyanocarbons.

For the organic compounds of the form R−N^{+}≡C^{−} instead of R−C≡N, they are referred to as isonitriles, or isocyanides.

Inorganic compounds containing the −C≡N group are not called nitriles, but cyanides instead. Though both nitriles and cyanides can be derived from cyanide salts, most nitriles are not nearly as toxic.

== Structure and basic properties ==
The N−C−C geometry is linear in nitriles, reflecting the sp hybridization of the triply bonded carbon. The C−N distance is short at 1.16 Å, consistent with a triple bond. Nitriles are polar, as indicated by high dipole moments. As liquids, they have high relative permittivities, often in the 30s.

== History ==
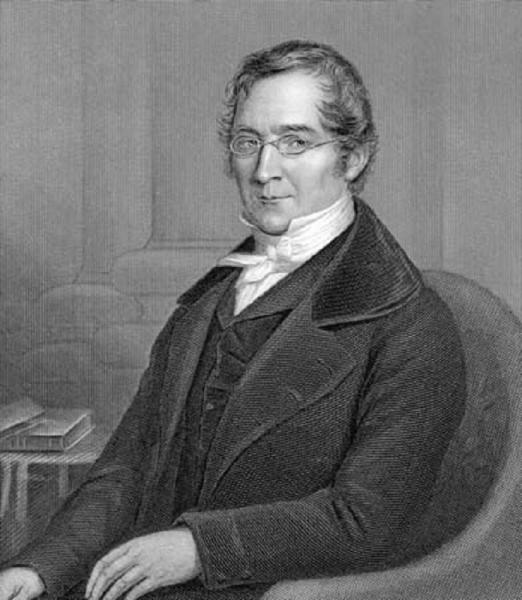
Joseph Louis Gay-Lussac was the first to produce dicyan in 1815

The first compound of the homolog row of nitriles, the nitrile of formic acid, hydrogen cyanide was first synthesized by C. W. Scheele in 1782. In 1811 J. L. Gay-Lussac was able to prepare the very toxic and volatile pure acid.

Around 1832 benzonitrile, the nitrile of benzoic acid, was prepared by Friedrich Wöhler and Justus von Liebig, but due to minimal yield of the synthesis neither physical nor chemical properties were determined nor a structure suggested. In 1834 Théophile-Jules Pelouze synthesized propionitrile, suggesting it to be an ether of propionic alcohol and hydrocyanic acid. The synthesis of benzonitrile by Hermann Fehling in 1844 by heating ammonium benzoate was the first method yielding enough of the substance for chemical research. Fehling determined the structure by comparing his results to the already known synthesis of hydrogen cyanide by heating ammonium formate. He coined the name "nitrile" for the newfound substance, which became the name for this group of compounds.

In 1903, Arthur Lapworth investigated the formation of cyanohydrins by addition of hydrocyanic acid to aldehydes and ketones and discovered that the actual nucleophile is the cyanide ion, such that the addition of a base increases the reaction rate. This work represented one of the earliest investigations of an organic reaction mechanism.

For a long time, nitriles were primarily of academic interest. Between the First and Second World War, however, research activity increased significantly. By the second half of the 20th century, several large-scale industrial processes had been developed in which nitriles were either produced or utilized. An important example is the development of polyamides (polyamide 6.6) in the 1930s, as adiponitrile is a key intermediate in its manufacture and is produced by hydrocyanation of butadiene with hydrogen cyanide. Acrylonitrile polymers have been known since the 1920s but gained greater importance as synthetic fibers toward the late 1940s. Superglues based on cyanoacrylates have also been available since the late 1940s.

== Nomenclature ==
Butyronitrile, according to IUPAC: Butanenitrile (blue marked C atom belongs to the main chain), formally also propanecarbonitrile (blue marked C atom belongs to the substituent)

The functional group of nitriles containing the C≡N triple bond is referred to as the nitrile or cyano group. If the nitrile is the highest-ranking functional group, the suffix -nitrile is added to the name of the parent compound. The triply bonded carbon atom is, as always, included in the parent chain. Alternatively, the ending -carbonitrile may be used (analogous to -carboxylic acid), in which case the carbon atom is not counted as part of the parent chain. This ending must be used if the nitrile group is attached to a ring (as in cyclopentanecarbonitrile) or if not all carbon atoms are part of the parent chain, which is necessarily the case when more than two nitrile groups are present, as these can only be located at the termini of the chain. Due to their relationship to carboxylic acids (the nitrile carbon has the same oxidation state as the carboxyl carbon), trivial names are often derived from the corresponding carboxylic acids using the ending -onitrile (for example, benzoic acid to benzonitrile). If the nitrile function is not the principal functional group in the molecule, the prefix cyano- is used together with the appropriate locant. In this case as well, the triple-bonded carbon atom is not counted as part of the parent chain.

== Synthesis ==
Numerous methods are available for the preparation of nitriles. These include Kolbe nitrile synthesis, dehydration of carboxylic acid amides and oximes, and oxidation of primary amines.

Industrially, the main methods for producing nitriles are ammoxidation and hydrocyanation. Both routes are green in the sense that they do not generate stoichiometric amounts of salts.

=== From organic halides and cyanide salts ===
Two salt metathesis reactions are popular for laboratory scale reactions. In the Kolbe nitrile synthesis, alkyl halides undergo nucleophilic aliphatic substitution with alkali metal cyanides. Aryl nitriles are prepared in the Rosenmund-von Braun synthesis.

In general, metal cyanides combine with alkyl halides to give a mixture of the nitrile and the isonitrile, although appropriate choice of counterion and temperature can minimize the latter. An alkyl sulfate obviates the problem entirely, particularly in nonaqueous conditions (the Pelouze synthesis).

In the Kolbe nitrile synthesis (a nucleophilic substitution reaction), an alkanonitrile and an alkali halide are formed from a reactive halocarbons and an alkali cyanide (sodium cyanide or potassium cyanide). The reaction is particularly suitable for primary, allylic, and benzylic halides. Secondary alkyl halides provide lower yields, whereas tertiary halides undergo exclusively elimination reaction instead of substitution. In addition to halides, substrates bearing other good leaving groups may also be employed. In contrast to alkali cyanides, silver cyanide is unsuitable for nitrile synthesis, as it preferentially forms isonitriles. An example of the Kolbe nitrile synthesis is the reaction of methyl iodide with sodium cyanide to yield acetonitrile and sodium iodide:

$\mathrm{CH_3I + NaCN \longrightarrow CH_3CN + NaI}$

Similarly, 1,3-dibromopropane reacts with sodium cyanide to form glutaronitrile, and 1-iodooctane reacts with potassium cyanide to give nonannitrile. Cyanations can also be carried out using hydrogen cyanide in combination with triethylaluminum or with diethylaluminum cyanide; for example, in the ring opening of an epoxide to a β-cyanohydrin or in the 1,4-addition of cyanide to an enone. Trimethylsilylcyanide is another cyanating reagent capable of opening epoxides to β-cyanohydrins, with concomitant silylation of the oxygen atom. Trimethylsilyl cyanide also enables substitution of tertiary alkyl halides, which is not feasible under Kolbe nitrile synthesis conditions.

In the presence of suitable transition metal catalysts, hydrocyanation allows addition of hydrogen cyanide to the multiple bonds of alkenes and alkynes to afford nitriles. Nickel catalysts are typically employed. Direct handling of hydrogen cyanide is often unnecessary, as synthetic equivalents such as acetone cyanohydrin or isovaleronitrile may be used. An important industrial process is the hydrocyanation of butadiene to adiponitrile.

=== Hydrocyanation ===
Hydrocyanation is an industrial method for producing nitriles from hydrogen cyanide and alkenes. The process requires homogeneous catalysts. An example of hydrocyanation is the production of adiponitrile, a precursor to nylon-6,6 from 1,3-butadiene:

CH_{2}=CH−CH=CH_{2} + 2 HC≡N → NC(CH_{2})_{4}C≡N

=== Dehydration of amides and others ===
Nitriles can be prepared by the dehydration of primary amides. Common reagents for this include phosphorus pentoxide (P_{2}O_{_{5}}) and thionyl chloride (SOCl_{2}). In a related dehydration, secondary amides give nitriles by the von Braun amide degradation. In this case, one C-N bond is cleaved.

Production of nitriles (center) by dehydration. Suitable starting materials are carboxylic acid amides (left) or aldoximes (right). The atoms of the eliminated water molecule are highlighted in blue

Specifically, carboxamides and oximes can be converted to nitriles by dehydration (elimination of water). Numerous reagents and methodologies are available for this transformation. Methods for nitrile synthesis via dehydration of nitroalkanes have also been described.

Phosphorus pentoxide, known since the mid-19th century, is a classical reagent for amide dehydration. Amides can also be dehydrated using trivalent phosphorus reagents such as phosphorus trichloride or triphenyl phosphite; as well as diethyl chlorophosphate, thionyl chloride, or phosgene. In the presence of specific palladium complexes or other suitable catalysts, acetonitrile can function as a dehydrating agent, converting an amide into a nitrile while being transformed into acetamide. Similarly, dichloroacetonitrile may be employed. Related systems utilize iron(II) chloride tetrahydrate, zinc trifluoromethanesulfonate, or uranyl nitrate as catalysts in combination with N-methyl-N-trimethylsilyltrifluoroacetamide as the dehydrating reagent. Carboxylic acid amides can also be dehydrated using a system comprising triphenylphosphane, iodine, and 4-methylmorpholine. Another approach involves high-temperature dehydration (220–240 °C) in hexamethylphosphoramide (HMPA). Dehydration of primary amides with zinc chloride under microwaves is reversible. In aqueous acetonitrile, an amide can be converted to a nitrile; however, in a water–tetrahydrofuran system with added acetamide, the reverse conversion of nitrile to amide occurs.

Both carboxamides and aldoximes can be dehydrated using aluminum chloride and sodium iodide in acetonitrile. Likewise, both classes can be dehydrated with oxalyl chloride and catalytic dimethyl sulfoxide in a reaction analogous to the Swern oxidation. Conversion to nitriles under catalysis by heptavalent rhenium species (perrhenic acid or trimethylsilyl perrhenate) is effective for both amides and aldoximes; the water formed can be removed by azeotropic distillation.

The conversion of aldehydes to nitriles via aldoximes is a popular laboratory route. Aldehydes react readily with hydroxylamine salts, sometimes at temperatures as low as ambient, to give aldoximes. These can be dehydrated to nitriles by simple heating, although a wide range of reagents may assist with this, including triethylamine/sulfur dioxide, zeolites, or sulfuryl chloride. The related hydroxylamine-O-sulfonic acid reacts similarly.

One-pot synthesis from aldehyde (Amberlyst is an acidic ion-exchange resin.)

In specialised cases the Van Leusen reaction can be used. Biocatalysts such as aliphatic aldoxime dehydratase are also effective.

Aldoximes may also be dehydrated with cyanuric chloride, the Burgess reagent, or a combination of trifluoromethanesulfonic acid anhydride and triphenylphosphine, the latter being oxidized to triphenylphosphine oxide. Catalytic dehydrogenation is likewise possible, for example with iron(III) triflate, copper(II) acetate, mixed hydroxides of tin and tungsten, or a bimetallic palladium–manganese catalyst. Enzymatic dehydration of aldoximes using aldoxime dehydratases has also been achieved. These bacterial enzymes, including those from Pseudomonas chlororaphis, have been applied repeatedly in nitrile synthesis.

=== Preparation from aldehydes and ketones ===
The Van Leusen reagent enables conversion of carbonyl compounds into nitriles

Aldehydes can be converted into oximes using hydroxylamine hydrochloride and subsequently dehydrated to nitriles (e.g., with oxalyl chloride). Direct transformation of aldehydes to nitriles is also possible using hydroxylamine-O-sulfonic acid or O-(4-trifluoromethylbenzoyl)hydroxylamine. Such conversions can also be accomplished with hydroxylamine in the presence of titanium(IV) chloride or mixed tin–tungsten hydroxides as catalysts, or by addition of sulfuryl fluoride or selenium dioxide. TosMIC (Van Leusen reagent) enables direct conversion of ketones into nitriles via the Van Leusen reaction, introducing the entire nitrile group and thus an additional carbon atom.

=== Oxidation of primary amines ===
TEMPO is suitable as a catalyst for the catalytic oxidation of primary amines to nitriles

Numerous traditional methods exist for nitrile preparation by amine oxidation. Common methods include the use of potassium persulfate, Trichloroisocyanuric acid, or anodic electrosynthesis. In addition, several selective methods have been developed in the last decades for electrochemical processes.

Several procedures employ nitroxyl radicals such as TEMPO or 4-acetamido-TEMPO as catalytic oxidants. These catalysts can be regenerated either by potassium peroxymonosulfate as the stoichiometric oxidant or electrochemically under applied potential. Another approach utilizes copper(I) chloride or copper(II) chloride as catalyst, molecular oxygen as the stoichiometric oxidant, and a molecular sieve to remove the water formed.

=== Ammoxidation ===
In ammoxidation, a hydrocarbon is partially oxidized in the presence of ammonia. This conversion is practiced on a large scale for acrylonitrile:

2 CH_{3}CH=CH_{2} + 3 O_{2} + 2 NH_{3} → 2 N≡CCH=CH_{2} + 6 H_{2}O

In the production of acrylonitrile, a side product is acetonitrile. On an industrial scale, several derivatives of benzonitrile, phthalonitrile, as well as Isobutyronitrile are prepared by ammoxidation. The process is catalysed by metal oxides and is assumed to proceed via the imine.

Ammoxidation is a heterogeneously catalyzed gas-phase reaction in which aliphatic or methyl-substituted aromatic compounds react with oxygen (air) and ammonia to form nitriles, with water as a by-product. Reaction temperatures exceed 300 °C, and oxides of vanadium, chromium, or molybdenum serve as catalysts. Acrylonitrile, an important precursor for polymer production (see Use section), is primarily manufactured by ammoxidation of propene. The principal industrial route to hydrogen cyanide is the Andrussov process, i.e., ammoxidation of methane over a platinum catalyst. However, a significant proportion of global hydrogen cyanide production arises as a by-product of acrylonitrile manufacture.

=== Preparation of aromatic nitriles ===
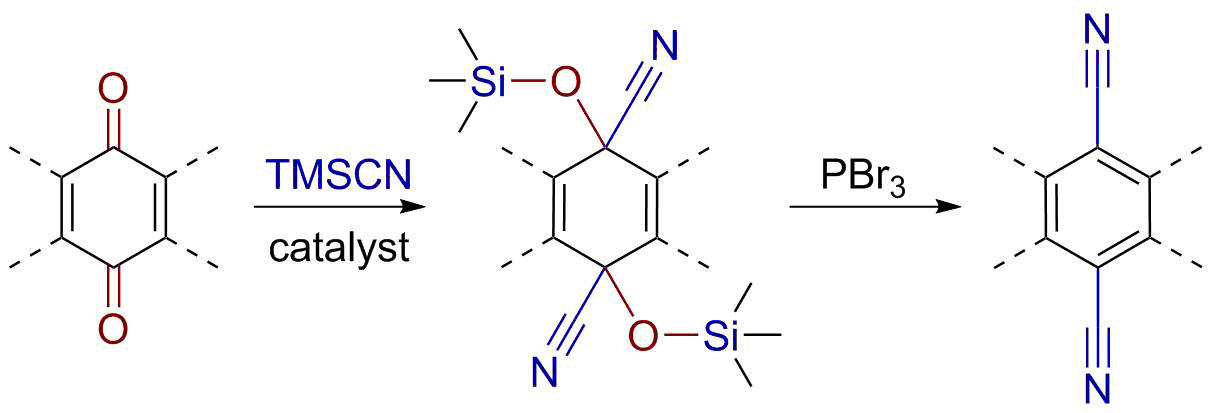
Preparation of aryl nitriles from quinones by reductive aromatization of silylated cyanohydrin intermediates

Aryl nitriles can be synthesized via the Sandmeyer reaction of diazonium salts with copper(I) cyanide or by the Rosenmund-von Braun reaction (direct reaction of an aryl bromide with copper(I) cyanide). Conversion of thiocyanate with aromatic carboxylic acids, known as Letts nitrile synthesis, can be carried out using potassium thiocyanate; lead thiocyanate generally provides higher yields.

Aryl iodides can be converted into aromatic nitriles under palladium catalysis with trimethylsilyl cyanide. For example, iodobenzene reacts with trimethylsilyl cyanide in the presence of tetrakis(triphenylphosphine)palladium(0) (Pd(PPh_{3})_{4}) to form benzonitrile. Another palladium-catalyzed route (also employing Pd(PPh_{3})_{4}) is the decarbonylation of aromatic acyl cyanides. Palladium-catalyzed cyanation of aryl chlorides with potassium cyanide or potassium hexacyanidoferrate(II) has likewise been reported. Quinones can react with trimethylsilyl cyanide to give silylated cyanohydrins, which are subsequently aromatized using phosphorus tribromide. A further approach involves reaction of aryl Grignard or aryllithium reagents with dimethylmalonitrile.

Aromatic nitriles are often prepared in the laboratory from the aniline via diazonium compounds. This is the Sandmeyer reaction. It requires transition metal cyanides.

ArN^{+}_{2} + CuC≡N → ArC≡N + N_{2} + Cu^{+}

=== Preparation of cyanohydrins ===
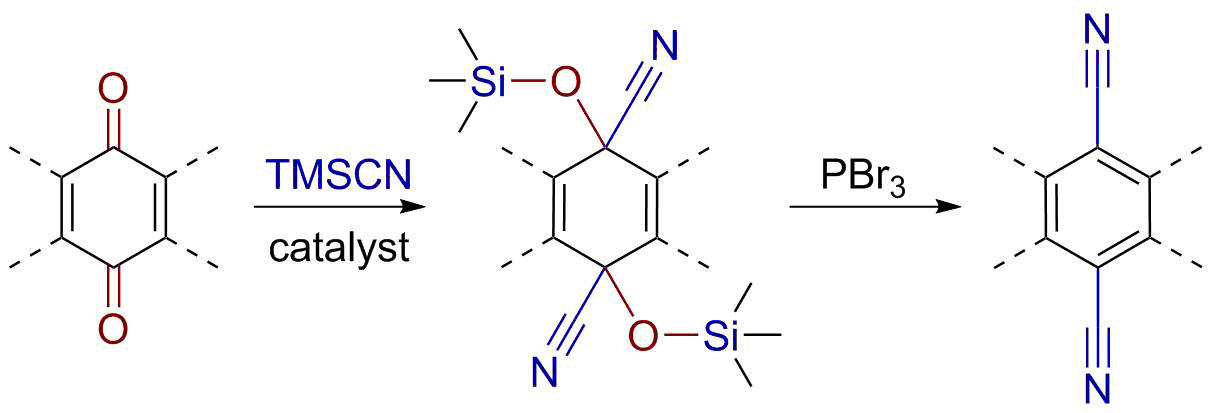
Synthesis of aromatic nitriles via silylated cyanohydrins

The cyanohydrins are a special class of nitriles. Classically they result from the addition of alkali metal cyanides to aldehydes in the cyanohydrin reaction. Because of the polarity of the organic carbonyl, this reaction requires no catalyst, unlike the hydrocyanation of alkenes. O-Silyl cyanohydrins are generated by the addition trimethylsilyl cyanide in the presence of a catalyst (silylcyanation). Cyanohydrins are also prepared by transcyanohydrin reactions starting, for example, with acetone cyanohydrin as a source of HCN.

Production of cyanohydrins: An aldehyde or ketone reacts with an alkali cyanide. M denotes an alkali metal

Cyanohydrins can also be prepared by addition of an alkali cyanide to an aldehyde or ketone in the presence of acetic acid. For less reactive substrates, diethylaluminum cyanide provides a suitable alternative. Another approach is transhydrocyanation, in which hydrogen cyanide is transferred from acetone cyanohydrin to an aldehyde or ketone. Suitable catalysts for this transformation include lanthanide alkoxides such as lanthanum(III) isopropoxide, cerium(III) isopropoxide, samarium(III) isopropoxide, and ytterbium(III) isopropoxide.

Addition of trimethylsilyl cyanide to aldehydes or ketones affords cyanohydrins as their trimethylsilyl ethers. Suitable catalysts include zinc iodide, potassium cyanide in combination with 18-crown-6, or ytterbium(III) cyanide. Under appropriate conditions, such reactions can be rendered enantioselective. Vanadium- or titanium-based catalysts bearing chiral salen-type ligands are suitable, as is the combination of tetraisopropyl orthotitanate with a chiral imine.

=== Preparation of acyl cyanides ===
Acyl cyanides (α-oxonitriles) can in certain cases be prepared by reacting carboxylic acid halides with transition metal cyanides (e.g., copper cyanide or silver cyanide). This approach is particularly effective for aromatic carboxylic acid halides and aliphatic acyl bromides, whereas aliphatic acyl chlorides are unreactive. Aliphatic acyl cyanides can instead be synthesized by reacting carboxylic acid chlorides with trimethylsilyl cyanide.

=== Enantioselective synthesis of chiral nitriles ===
Using chiral pool starting materials, enantioselective synthesis enables access to α-chiral nitrile-containing compounds in eutomeric form, such as vildagliptin and saxagliptin. Conventional transformations can introduce the nitrile functionality; for example, an enantiomerically pure amide or oxime derived from naturally enantiopure proline may be dehydrated. The applicability of such strategies depends on the specific target molecule. Asymmetric cyanation reactions are also established. Of particular importance is the asymmetric hydrocyanation of carbonyl compounds (see section on cyanohydrin preparation). In addition, numerous asymmetric hydrocyanations of imines have been developed, affording enantiomerically pure α-aminonitriles.

=== Other methods ===
- A commercial source for the cyanide group is diethylaluminum cyanide Et_{2}AlCN which can be prepared from triethylaluminium and HCN. It has been used in nucleophilic addition to ketones. For an example of its use see: Kuwajima Taxol total synthesis
- Cyanide ions facilitate the coupling of dibromides. Reaction of α,α′-dibromoadipic acid with sodium cyanide in ethanol yields the cyano cyclobutane:
- Aromatic nitriles can be prepared from base hydrolysis of trichloromethyl aryl ketimines (RC(CCl_{3})=NH) in the Houben-Fischer synthesis
- α-Amino acids form nitriles and carbon dioxide via various means of oxidative decarboxylation. Henry Drysdale Dakin discovered this oxidation in 1916.
- From aryl carboxylic acids (Letts nitrile synthesis)
- Carbocyanation enables addition of a nitrile group across a multiple bond to yield a further nitrile. Aryl nitriles can be added to alkynes under catalysis by bis(cyclooctadiene)nickel(0) and trimethylphosphine, affording α,β-unsaturated nitriles. Modification of the reaction conditions, for example by employing a different phosphane or adding a frustrated Lewis pair such as trimethylaluminum or triphenylborane, allows addition of non-aromatic nitriles, both saturated and α,β-unsaturated. Carbocyanation reactions that couple two molecules while introducing a nitrile group are also known, using hexabutyldistannane and tosyl cyanide as the cyanide source.
- Carboxylic acids can be converted to the corresponding nitriles by reaction with indium(III) chloride in acetonitrile at 200 °C. In this process, acetonitrile functions both as solvent and nitrogen source and is converted into acetic acid. The reaction proceeds via multiple Mumm rearrangements. Alcohols can be transformed into nitriles by a Mitsunobu reaction, employing cyanomethylidene trimethyl phosphorane in the presence of acetone cyanohydrin. N-Alkylamides can be converted to nitriles via the von Braun degradation using phosphorus pentachloride. Alternative reagents include phosphorus pentabromide and carbonyl bromide.

== Reactions ==
Nitrile groups in organic compounds can undergo a variety of reactions depending on the reactants or conditions. A nitrile group can be hydrolyzed, reduced, or ejected from a molecule as a cyanide ion.

=== Hydrolysis ===
The hydrolysis of nitriles RCN proceeds in the distinct steps under acid or base treatment to first give carboxamides RC(O)NH_{2} and then carboxylic acids RC(O)OH. The hydrolysis of nitriles to carboxylic acids is efficient. In acid or base, the balanced equations are as follows:

RC≡N + 2 H_{2}O + HCl → RC(O)OH + NH_{4}Cl
RC≡N + H_{2}O + NaOH → RC(O)ONa + NH_{3}

Strictly speaking, these reactions are mediated (as opposed to catalyzed) by acid or base, since one equivalent of the acid or base is consumed to form the ammonium or carboxylate salt, respectively.

Kinetic studies show that the second-order rate constant for hydroxide-ion catalyzed hydrolysis of acetonitrile to acetamide is 1.6×10^{−6} M^{−1} s^{−1}, which is slower than the hydrolysis of the amide to the carboxylate (7.4×10^{−5} M^{−1} s^{−1}). Thus, the base hydrolysis route will afford the carboxylate (or the amide contaminated with the carboxylate). On the other hand, the acid catalyzed reactions requires a careful control of the temperature and of the ratio of reagents in order to avoid the formation of polymers, which is promoted by the exothermic character of the hydrolysis. The classical procedure to convert a nitrile to the corresponding primary amide calls for adding the nitrile to cold concentrated sulfuric acid. The further conversion to the carboxylic acid is disfavored by the low temperature and low concentration of water.

RC≡N + H_{2}O → RC(O)NH_{2}

Two families of enzymes catalyze the hydrolysis of nitriles. Nitrilases hydrolyze nitriles to carboxylic acids:

RC≡N + 2 H_{2}O → RC(O)OH + NH_{3}

Nitrile hydratases are metalloenzymes that hydrolyze nitriles to amides.

RC≡N + H_{2}O → RC(O)NH_{2}

These enzymes are used commercially to produce acrylamide.

The "anhydrous hydration" of nitriles to amides has been demonstrated using an oxime as water source:

RC≡N + R'C(H)=NOH → RC(O)NH_{2} + R'C≡N

=== Reduction ===
Nitriles are susceptible to hydrogenation over diverse metal catalysts. The reaction can afford either the primary amine (RCH_{2}NH_{2}) or the tertiary amine ((RCH_{2})_{3}N), depending on conditions. In conventional organic reductions, nitrile is reduced by treatment with lithium aluminium hydride to the amine. Reduction to the imine followed by hydrolysis to the aldehyde takes place in the Stephen aldehyde synthesis, which uses stannous chloride in acid.

=== Deprotonation ===
Alkyl nitriles are sufficiently acidic to undergo deprotonation of the C-H bond adjacent to the C≡N group. Strong bases are required, such as lithium diisopropylamide and butyl lithium. The product is referred to as a nitrile anion. These carbanions alkylate a wide variety of electrophiles. Key to the exceptional nucleophilicity is the small steric demand of the C≡N unit combined with its inductive stabilization. These features make nitriles ideal for creating new carbon-carbon bonds in sterically demanding environments.

=== Nucleophiles ===
The carbon center of a nitrile is electrophilic, hence it is susceptible to nucleophilic addition reactions:

- with an organozinc compound in the Blaise reaction
- with alcohols in the Pinner reaction.
- with amines, e.g. the reaction of the amine sarcosine with cyanamide yields creatine
- with arenes to form ketones in the Houben–Hoesch reaction via an imine intermediate.
- with Grignard reagents to form primary ketimines in the Moureau-Mignonac ketimine synthesis. While not a classical Grignard reaction, it may be considered one under broader modern definitions.

=== Miscellaneous methods and compounds ===
- In reductive decyanation the nitrile group is replaced by a proton. Decyanations can be accomplished by dissolving metal reduction (e.g. HMPA and potassium metal in tert-butanol) or by fusion of a nitrile in KOH. Similarly, α-aminonitriles can be decyanated with other reducing agents such as lithium aluminium hydride.
- In the so-called Franchimont Reaction (developed by the Belgian doctoral student Antoine Paul Nicolas Franchimont (1844-1919) in 1872), an α-cyanocarboxylic acid heated in acid hydrolyzes and decarboxylates to a dimer.
- Nitriles self-react in presence of base in the Thorpe reaction in a nucleophilic addition
- In organometallic chemistry nitriles are known to add to alkynes in carbocyanation:

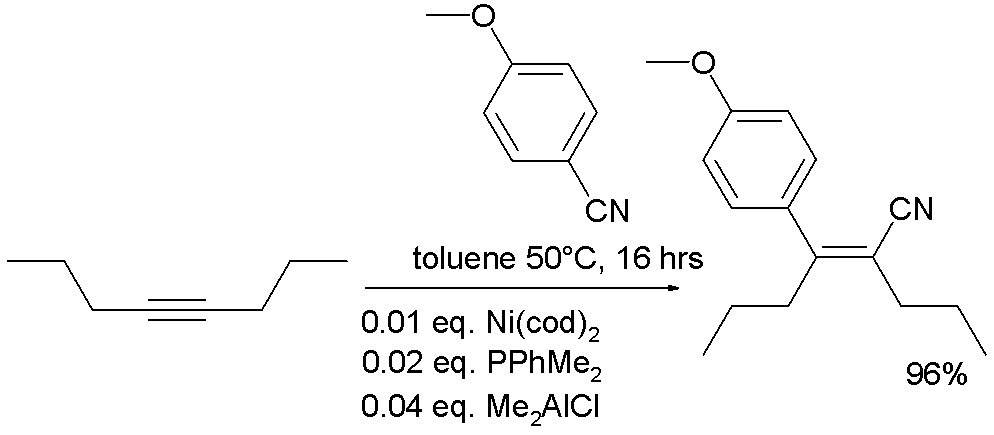

=== Complexation ===
Nitriles are precursors to transition metal nitrile complexes, which are reagents and catalysts. Examples include tetrakis(acetonitrile)copper(I) hexafluorophosphate ([Cu(MeCN)_{4}]^{+}) and bis(benzonitrile)palladium dichloride (PdCl_{2}(PhCN)_{2}).

== Nitrile derivatives ==
Compound classes containing a C≡N triple bond. Left (from top to bottom): hydrogen cyanide, nitriles, isonitriles. Center: cyanates, thiocyanates, cyanamides. Right: nitrile oxides, nitrile sulphides, nitrilimines, nitrilium ions

Nitriles are isomeric with isonitriles (isocyanides). These also contain a C≡N triple bond; however, the substituent is bonded via the nitrogen atom, which results in a zwitterionic structure.

Compounds in which an oxygen atom is bonded to the carbon atom of a C≡N group are referred to as cyanates. If the oxygen atom is replaced by a sulfur or selenium atom, the compounds are termed thiocyanates or selenocyanates. If the cyano group is bonded to a nitrogen atom, the compound is referred to as a cyanamide.

In addition to nitriles, other classes of compounds are known that contain a C≡N triple bond in which the nitrogen atom forms a fourth bond and therefore bears a positive formal charge. In nitrile oxides, the fourth bond is to an additional oxygen atom. If this atom is sulfur or another nitrogen atom instead, the compounds are referred to as nitrile sulfides or nitrilimines, respectively. If the nitrogen atom of the nitrile is protonated or carries an additional organic substituent, the compound is a nitrilium ion. If the nitrogen atom carries an organic substituent bearing a negatively charged carbon atom, the species is a nitrile ylide, a subclass of ylides.

=== Organic cyanamides ===
Cyanamides are N-cyano compounds with general structure R^{1}R^{2}N−C≡N and related to the parent cyanamide.

=== Nitrile oxides ===
Nitrile oxides have the chemical formula RCNO. Their general structure is R−C≡N^{+}−O^{−}. The R stands for any group (typically organyl, e.g., acetonitrile oxide CH_{3}−C≡N^{+}−O^{−}, hydrogen in the case of fulminic acid H−C≡N^{+}−O^{−}, or halogen (e.g., chloroformonitrile oxide Cl−C≡N^{+}−O^{−}).

Nitrile oxides are quite different from nitriles and do not arise from direct oxidation of the latter. Instead, they can be synthesised by nitroalkane (nitronate) dehydration, oxime dehydrogenation, or halooxime elimination in base. They are highly reactive in 1,3-dipolar cycloadditions, such as to isoxazoles, and undergo type I dyotropic rearrangement to isocyanates.

The heavier nitrile sulfides are extremely reactive and rare, but temporarily form during the thermolysis of oxathiazolones. They react similarly to nitrile oxides.

== Occurrence ==
More than 100 naturally occurring nitriles were known as early as the 1990s, and several hundred have since been identified. These compounds occur in bacteria, fungi, plants, and arthropods and sponges. The biosynthesis of naturally occurring nitriles frequently begins with amino acids. Their N-hydroxylation followed by decarboxylation (cleavage of the carboxylic acid group as carbon dioxide) yields oximes, which serve as the direct precursors of nitriles.

=== Occurrence in plants ===
Numerous nitriles occur as secondary metabolites in plants.

In Ricinus communis (Ricinus communis), in addition to the highly toxic protein ricin, the alkaloid ricinin is present, which contains a nitrile functional group. The structurally closely related nudiflorin occurs in Trevia nudiflora (family spurge family). In brown mustard, indoleacetonitrile is present; it is formed from indoleacetaldoxime and presumably functions in defense against pathogenic fungi. In jojoba, various nitriles are found, including simmondsin, a glycoside containing an α,β-unsaturated nitrile moiety in the aglycone. A similar compound, menis daurin, occurs in European holly (Ilex aquifolium). α,β-Unsaturated nitriles are also present in several species of the genus Acacia, including Sutherlandin and Acacipetalin. The horseradish tree (horseradish tree) contains niazirine, a glycoside of 4-hydroxyphenylacetonitrile. The fragrant sweet pea (Lathyrus odoratus) causes the disease lathyrism, for which N-glutamyl-3-aminopropionitrile and its degradation product 3-aminopropionitrile are responsible. The essential oil of Heracleum transcaucasicum (genus hogweed) contains geranylnitrile. 3-cyanopyridine is found in annual bindweed. Cyanolipids are a class of lipids that occur exclusively in soap tree plants (Sapindaceae). Their alcohol component is an unsaturated nitrile with five carbon atoms and one or two hydroxy groups, in contrast to glycerol in glycerides. Soap tree plants containing cyanolipids include soapnut tree and guarana. Hydrogen cyanide is released by many plants containing corresponding cyanogenic compounds, particularly cyanogenic glycosides and cyanolipids. In plants, hydrogen cyanide also functions as a signaling molecule.

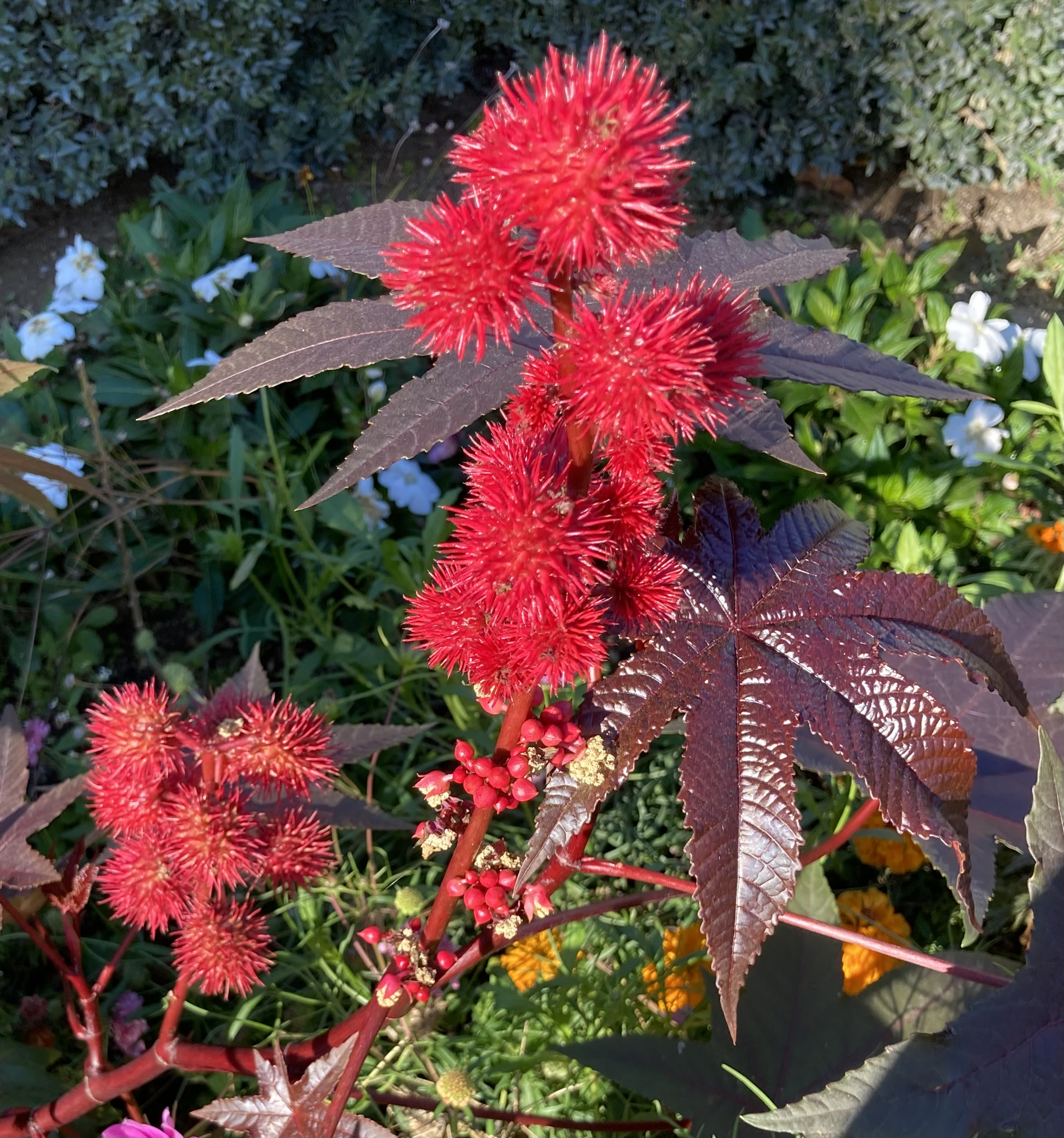
Ricinus plant

Ricinin

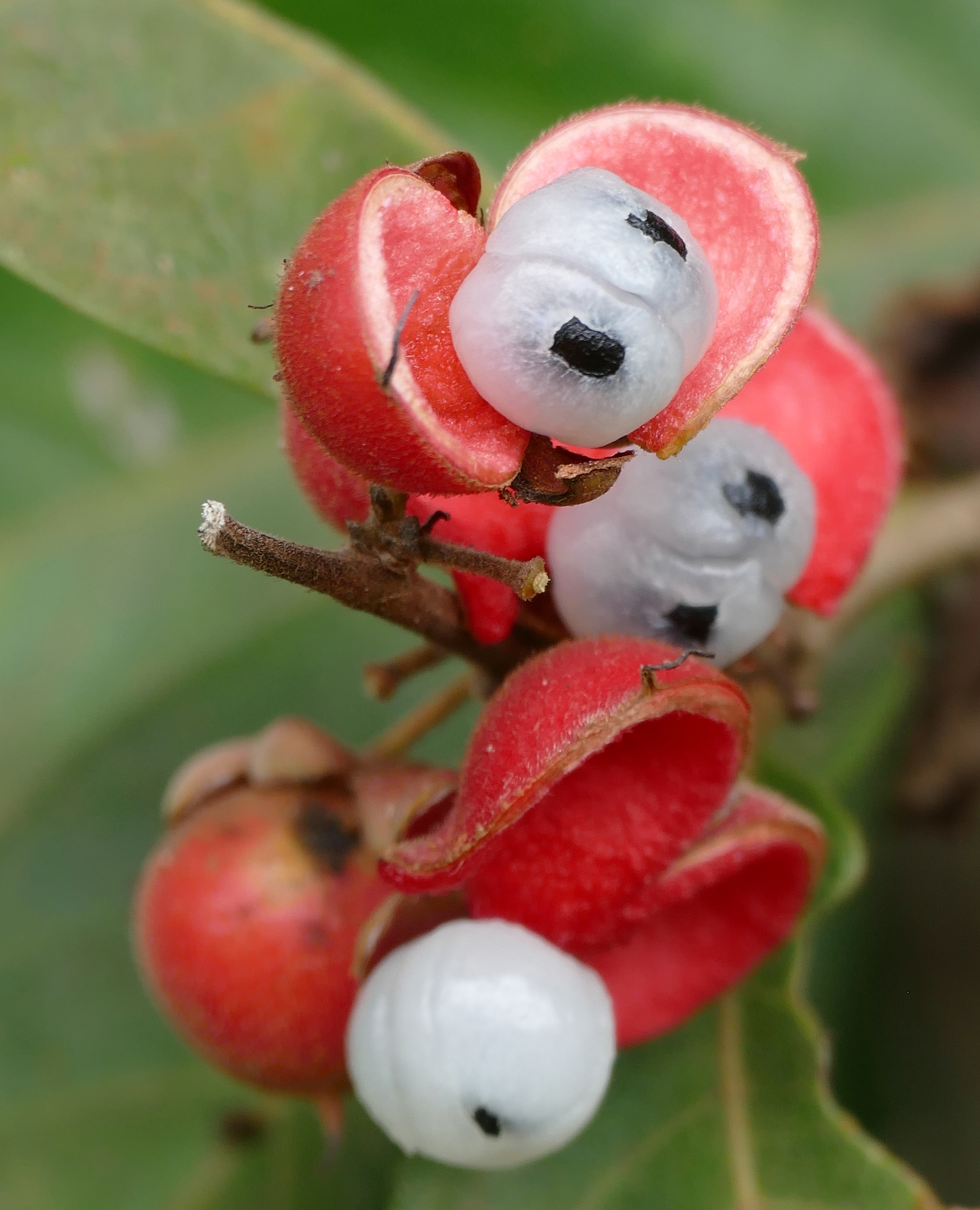
Guaraná, a soap tree plant, contains cyanolipids

An alcohol component of cyanolipids, found for example in guaraná

==== Nitriles from glucosinolates in cruciferous plants ====
An important group of natural products that serve as precursors of nitriles are the mustard oil glycosides (glucosinolates), which are biosynthesized analogously to direct nitrile formation via an aldoxime intermediate. Glucosinolates constitute a major class of secondary metabolites produced by plants of the cruciferous family (Brassicaceae) for defense against herbivores and microorganisms. Normally, glucosinolates are hydrolyzed by myrosinase to isothiocyanates; however, in the presence of an additional protein (epithio specifier protein), nitriles are formed instead. Sinigrin is found primarily in horseradish, wasabi, and brown mustard, but also in head cabbage, kale, cauliflower, and Brussels sprouts; in addition to allyl isothiocyanate, it can be degraded to allyl cyanide (3-butenenitrile). Glucotropaeolin, present in garden cress, is degraded to phenylacetonitrile; gluconasturtiin, found in watercress, is degraded to 3-phenylpropionitrile. Sinalbin, occurring in Lepidium draba, can analogously be degraded to 4-hydroxyphenylacetonitrile.

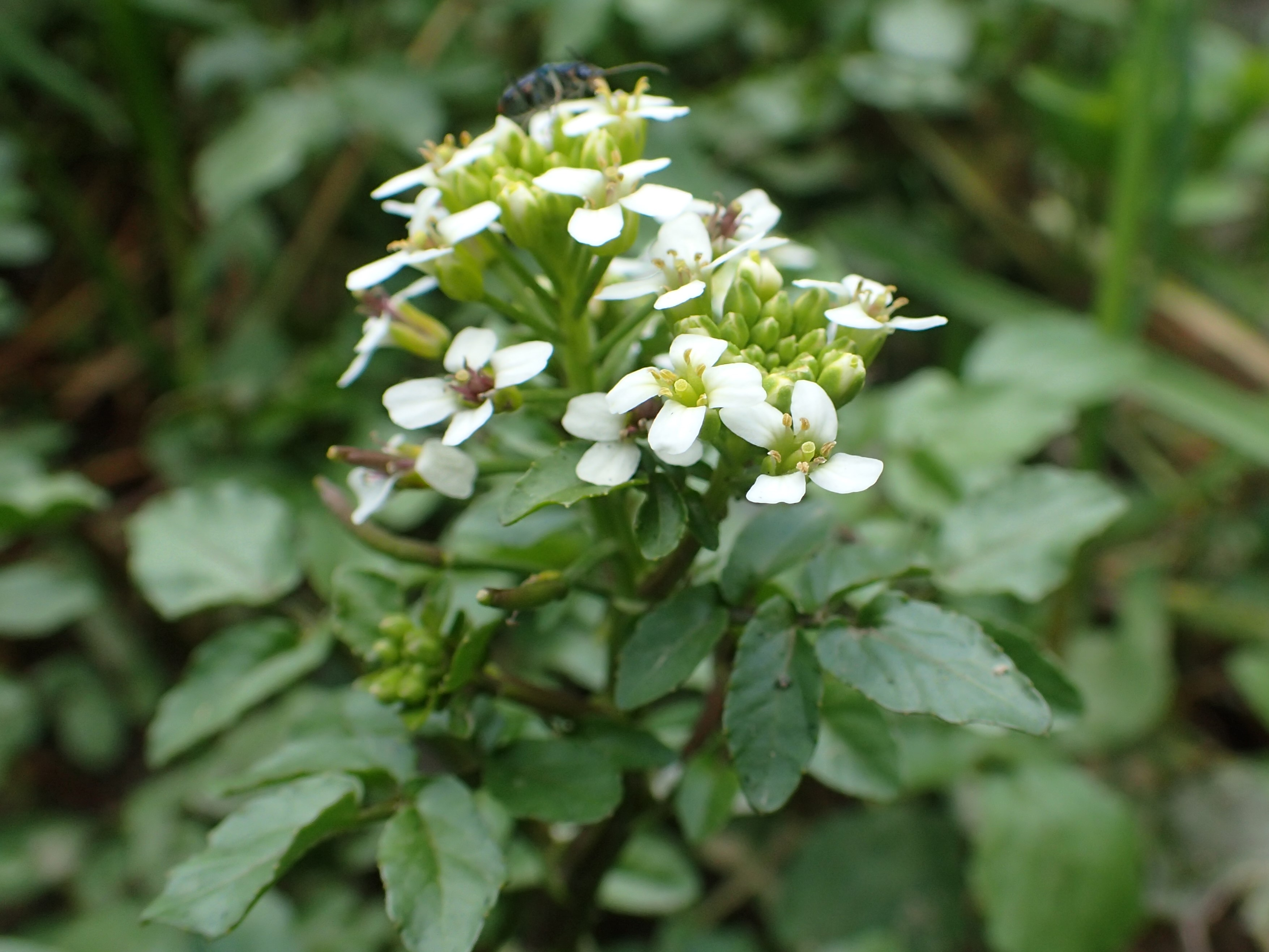
Watercress

Structure of gluconasturtiin

Structure of phenylpropionitrile

==== Cyanohydrins and cyanogenic glycosides ====
Cyanohydrins and their glycosides, referred to as cyanogenic glycosides, are widespread in nature and occur in several thousand plant species. More than one hundred naturally occurring cyanogenic glycosides have been identified. Plants utilize cyanogenic glycosides for defense and possibly also as a nitrogen storage buffer. They are biosynthesized from a limited number of amino acids and various carbohydrates. Upon tissue damage, the glycosides come into contact with enzymes (Β-glucosidase and hydroxynitrillyase), which first release the aglycone (a cyanohydrin) and subsequently cleave it into a carbonyl compound and toxic hydrocyanic acid. Amygdalin is a glycoside of mandelonitrile and one of the most widespread cyanogenic glycosides; it occurs particularly in the seeds of the rose family (Rosaceae), including cultivated apple, apricot, peach, plum, cherry, and almond tree. Whereas amygdalin is confined to the seeds of peaches, other parts of the plant predominantly contain prunasin. Prunasin is likewise a glycoside of mandelonitrile; however, its sugar moiety is a monosaccharide (rather than a disaccharide as in amygdalin). In almonds and bitter almonds, prunasin serves as a biosynthetic precursor of amygdalin. Prunasin is also present in laurel cherry. Prunasin and sambunigrin, along with several other cyanogenic glycosides, occur in passion flower; in papaya, prunasin predominates. Sambunigrin, also a glycoside of mandelonitrile, is found in several species of the genus elderberry (Sambucus), including black elderberry and Canadian elderberry, as well as in Ximenia americana. Vicianin, another mandelonitrile glycoside, occurs in ferns of the genus Davellia (family Davalliaceae). Dhurrin is a cyanogenic glycoside of 4-hydroxymandelonitrile found in sorghum millet and other species of the genus sorghum millet, including Sorghum halepense. Linamarin (with the aglycone acetone cyanohydrin) and lotaustralin (with the aglycone butanone cyanohydrin) occur in the genera Linum (for example in common flax) and lotus flowers, as well as in the common bean. Both compounds are also present in cassava. The mistletoe species Loranthus micranthus (genus Loranthus) contains linamarin gallate, a derivative in which linamarin is additionally esterified with gallic acid. The rubber tree also contains linamarin; studies indicate that in this case the compound likely serves as an important storage substance in addition to its defensive function. The seeds contain particularly high concentrations, and during seedling development the compound is metabolized without releasing hydrocyanic acid, suggesting utilization in other biosynthetic pathways.

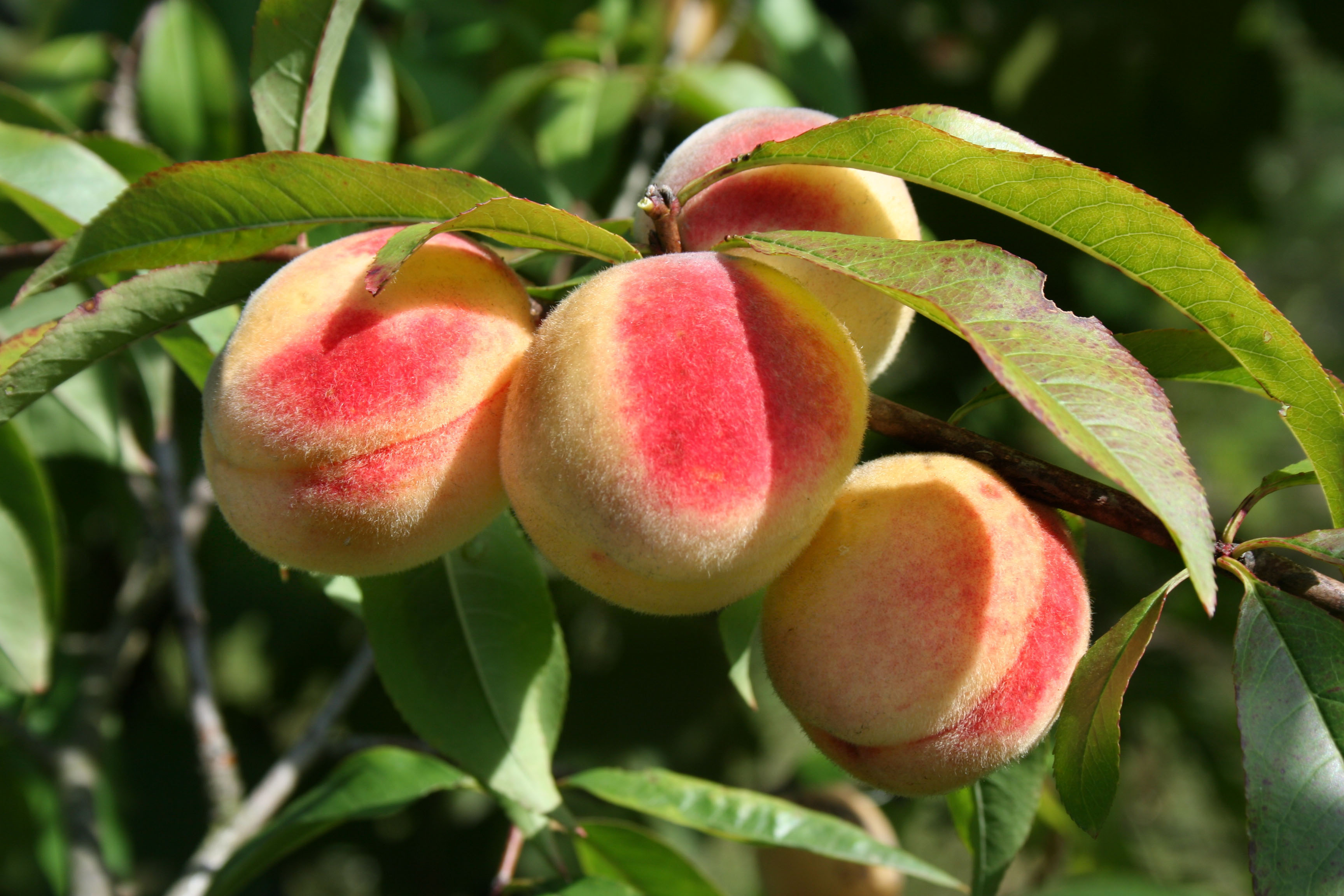
Peach tree

Structure of amygdalin

Structure of prunasin

Mandelonitrile, the aglycone of amygdalin and prunasin

=== Occurrence in animals ===
Numerous arthropods (Arthropoda) contain cyanogenic (hydrogen cyanide-releasing) nitrile compounds, including centipedes (Chilopoda), bipedes (Diplopoda), beetles (Hemiptera), beetles (Coleoptera), and butterflies (Lepidoptera). The gooseberry moth (Abraxas grossulariata) contains the nitrile-bearing glycoside sarmentosin, which likely functions in defense. Sarmentosin is also present in several species of the genus Parnassius. Several species of glass-winged bug (including Jadera haematoloma) contain cyanolipids or cardiospermine, which they may acquire from their host plants through sequestration of toxins, i.e., uptake and storage. Six-spotted damselflies are butterflies capable of both sequestering the cyanogenic glycosides linamarin and lotaustralin from their host plants and synthesizing them de novo. Other species of the same genus (Zygaena), such as the Marsh Hornwort, also contain cyanogenic glycosides. The defensive secretion of the centipede Himantarium gabrielis contains benzoyl cyanide, phenylacetonitrile, mandelonitrile (benzaldehyde cyanohydrin), and mandelonitrile benzoate. Phenylacetonitrile also functions as a hormone in the desert locust (Schistocerca gregaria). In various tapeworms (Polydesmida), the defensive secretion likewise contains benzoyl cyanide. The mite species Oribatula tibialis (order horn mite, Oribatida) contains mandelonitrile hexanoate. Hydrogen cyanide also occurs in arthropods as a degradation product of cyanogenic compounds.

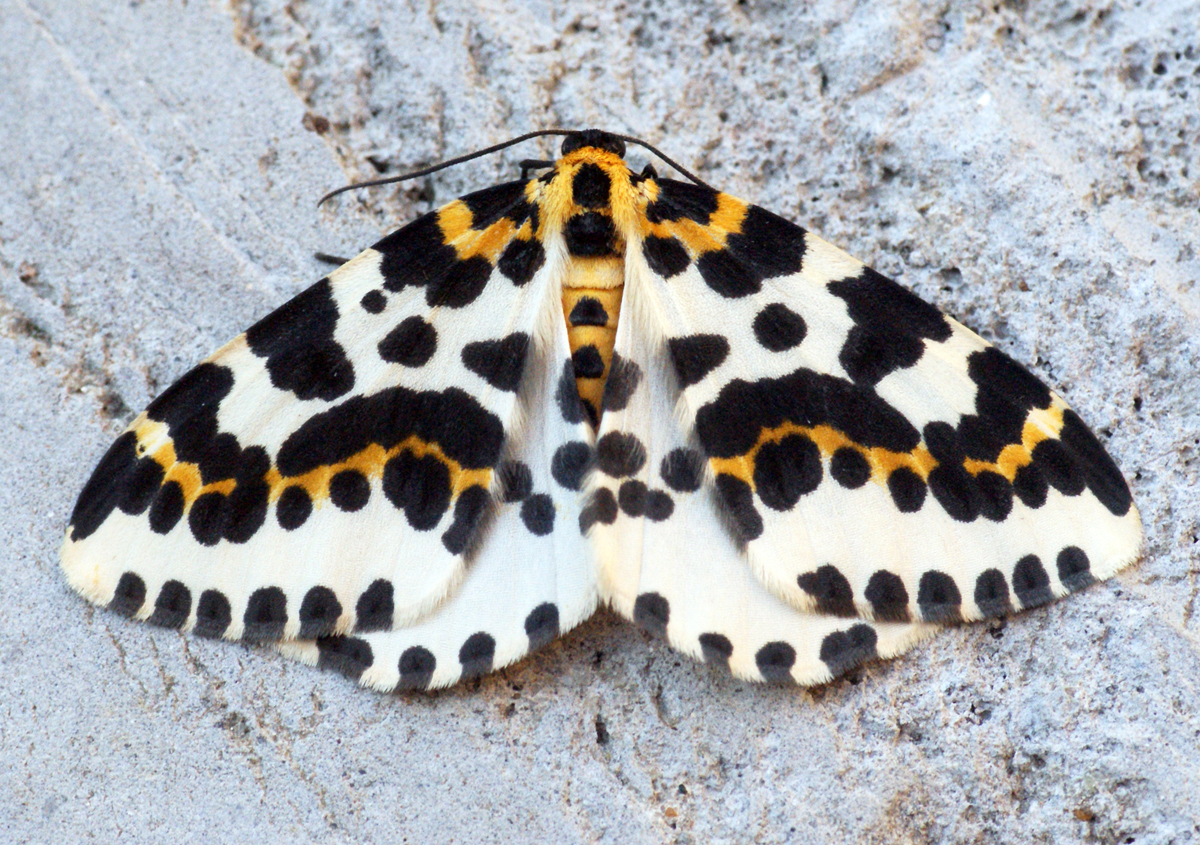
Gooseberry moth

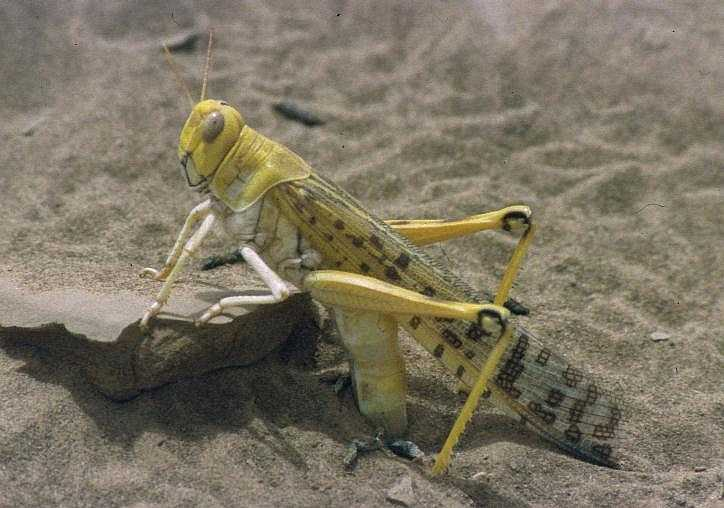
Desert locust

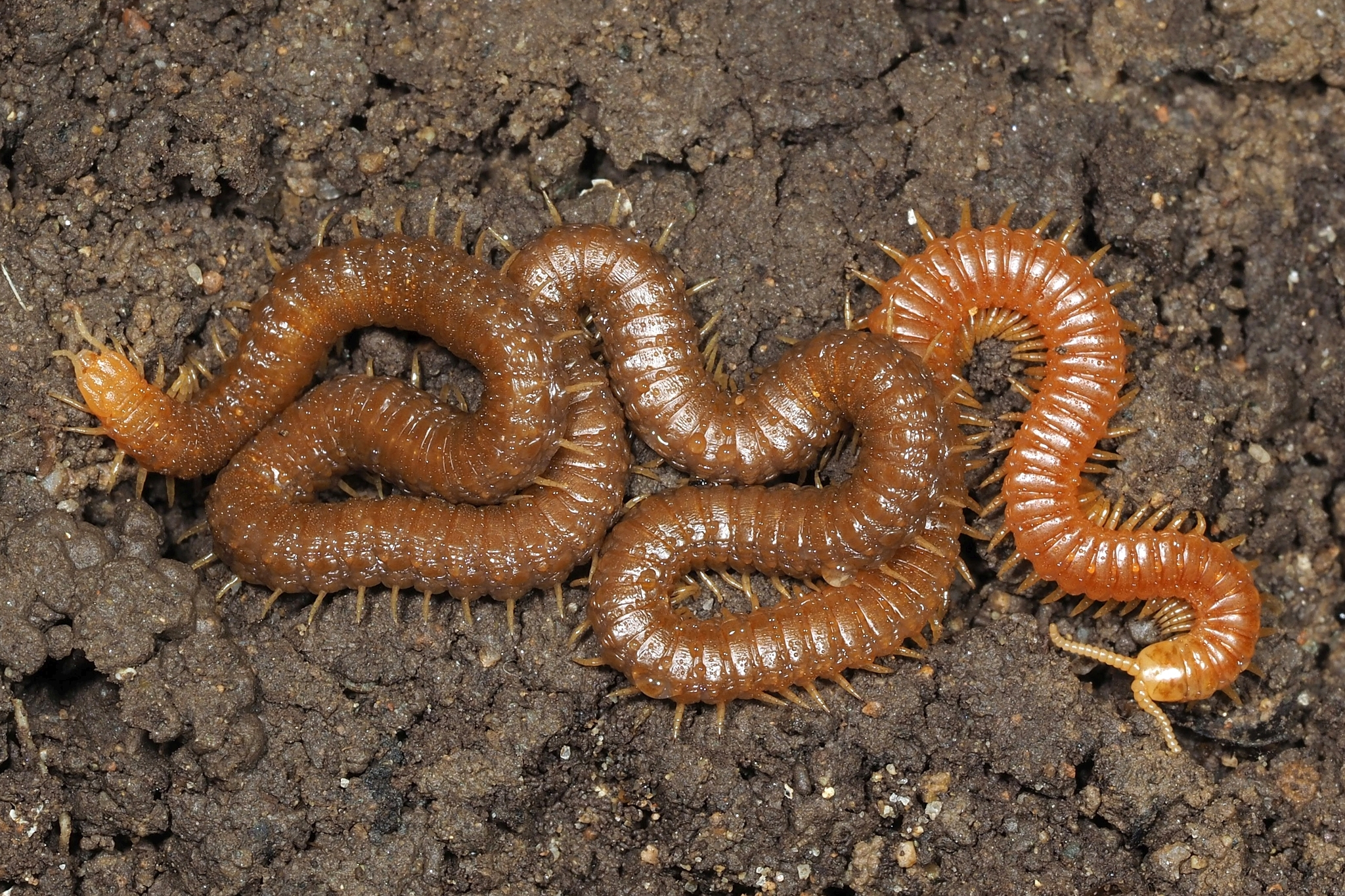
Himantarium gabrielis

Benzoyl cyanide is found in the defensive secretions of various arthropods

In addition to arthropods, marine animals also contain nitrile compounds. These include bursatellin from broad-footed snails of the genus Bursatella and the calyculins isolated from sponges. The albanitriles from sponges of the genus Mycale are linear compounds (chain length 16 to 18 carbon atoms) bearing a nitrile group at one or both termini and several additional C≡C triple bonds.

=== Occurrence in fungi ===
Many fungi produce hydrogen cyanide from glycine. These include representatives of the genera funnel mushrooms (Clitocybe), dwindlers (Marasmius), stem porcini (Polyporus), and Ritterlinge (Tricholoma). The epurpurins are a group of yellow phenolic pigments, each bearing two nitrile groups, occurring in Emericella purpurea. Diatretin II occurs in Fleshy Fungus (Clitocybe diatreta) and in the purple reddish bolete. In the clove dwarf mushroom, the cyanohydrin of glyoxylic acid is present; it is formed from two glycine molecules and releases hydrocyanic acid upon tissue damage.

=== Occurrence in bacteria ===
Hydrogen cyanide is produced by various soil bacteria, including cyanobacteria and representatives of the genera Aeromonas, Bacillus, and Pseudomonas. Biosynthesis proceeds from glycine. A group of alkanenitriles was isolated from Pseudomonas veronii: dodecannitrile, tridecannitrile, tetradecanenitrile, pentadecannitrile, and hexadecannitrile, as well as compounds of similar chain length containing a double bond. From Micromonospora echinospora, structurally related compounds were also isolated, differing by a terminal methyl branch, a double bond, or both. A cyanohydrin containing a phosphonic acid moiety is known from Streptomyces regensis. The aetokthonotoxin from the cyanobacteria Aetokthonos hydrillicola is a brominated indole derivative bearing a nitrile group. It is a potent neurotoxin that frequently causes mortality in bald eagles that ingest it.

=== Occurrence in space ===
Nitriles are among the most abundant organic molecules in space, and more than ten distinct compounds have been unequivocally detected. Hydrogen cyanide was one of the first polyatomic species identified in space and occurs there relatively frequently and in substantial quantities. Other nitriles detected in space include acetonitrile and aminoacetonitrile, as well as butyronitrile, cyanoacetylene, and cyanopolyins containing two to five conjugated triple bonds. Hydrogen cyanide, cyanoacetylene, and cyanogen are present in the atmosphere of Saturn's moon Titan.

=== Significance for the origin of life ===
Nitriles may have played a significant role in chemical evolution on Earth. Experimental studies have demonstrated that hydrogen cyanide can form under a wide range of plausible prebiotic conditions. Possible starting materials include gas mixtures of methane, carbon dioxide, nitrogen, ammonia, and/or hydrogen. Various energy sources, such as electrical discharges or ultraviolet radiation, are likewise conceivable. Under simple conditions, hydrogen cyanide can give rise to numerous additional organic molecules. Hydrogen cyanide and other nitriles, such as cyanoacetylene and dicyan, are considered potential precursors of nucleic bases. Aminonitriles, in turn, are regarded as likely precursors of amino acids and peptides; for example, aminoacetonitrile is a precursor of glycine. An analogous process to the Strecker synthesis is proposed, in which α-aminopropionitrile initially forms from cyanide, acetaldehyde, and ammonia and is subsequently hydrolyzed to alanine.

== Use ==
Hydrogen cyanide is used on a large scale in the chemical industry as an intermediate for the production of other compounds. Acrylonitrile is an important feedstock for the manufacture of nitrile polymers. Acetonitrile is an important solvent. Other nitriles are employed as fragrances, pesticides, and chemical reagents. The nitrile group also plays a significant role in the development of active pharmaceutical ingredients.

=== Hydrogen cyanide ===
Hydrogen cyanide (HCN) downstream products: acetone cyanohydrin, methyl methacrylate and its polymer PMMA (top row); cyanuric chloride (top center); methionine (bottom center); adiponitrile, hexamethylene diamine and polyamide 6.6 (bottom row)

Hydrogen cyanide is a bulk chemical; global production in 2001 was approximately 2.6 million tons. Key derivatives include adiponitrile, acetone cyanohydrin, sodium cyanide, and cyanuric chloride. Hydrogen cyanide's versatility arises from its nature as a C1 synthon easily convertable to carboxylic acids and amides. For example, the chelating agent ethylenediaminetetraacetic acid is synthesized from formaldehyde, ethylenediamine, hydrogen cyanide, and sodium hydroxide.

An important industrial route to amino acids is the Strecker synthesis, in which hydrogen cyanide serves as a starting material. A quantitatively important amino acid is methionine, which is produced from acrolein, hydrogen cyanide, and hydrogen sulphide and is used primarily in animal feed.

=== Plastics production ===
Several widely used polymers contain acrylonitrile as a monomer and therefore incorporate nitrile groups. Pure polyacrylonitrile (PAN) is difficult to process; consequently, during its production, 85 to 99% acrylonitrile is almost always copolymerized with small amounts of other monomers. Copolymers containing 35 to 85% acrylonitrile, together with other monomers such as vinyl acetate and methyl methacrylate, are also employed. Nitrile polymers are among the most important fully synthetic materials for textile fibers, alongside polyesters and polyamidess. These fibers, known as acrylic fibers, are produced on the scale of several million tons per year. In 2000, global production was approximately 2.7 million tons. Acrylic fibers are used in garments (such as socks and sweaters), blankets, carpets, and knitting yarn, among other applications. PAN is also the principal precursor for the production of carbon fiber, which is used as an exceptionally lightweight yet strong material in automotive and aircraft construction. Global production of the monomer acrylonitrile was approximately 3.2 million tons in 1988.

Acrylonitrile butadiene rubbers are known as nitrile rubbers and exhibit advantageous properties such as high tensile strength, high abrasion resistance, and resistance to hydrocarbons (oils and fuels). They are therefore used for sealing rings and for oil and fuel hoses. Another important application of nitrile rubber is protective gloves, which are frequently used in healthcare instead of latex clothing gloves, as the latter often cause latex allergies. Such gloves are also commonly used when handling hazardous chemicals, including organic solvents.

Another important polymer is the terpolymer of acrylonitrile, butadiene, and styrene (acrylonitrile-butadiene-styrene copolymer). This material is widely used for the outer housings of electronic devices (computers, monitors, and keyboards). Other applications include automotive plastic components (e.g., headlight and mirror housings), refrigerator liners, housings for kitchen appliances, vacuum cleaners, and power tools, as well as suitcases, snack containers, and toys, including Lego. ABS is also produced on the scale of several million tons annually; for example, about 2.7 million tons were manufactured in 1992.

Polyamide (nylon) is not a nitrile polymer; however, a key intermediate in its production is adiponitrile. Adiponitrile is obtained by hydrocyanation of butadiene or by dimerization of acrylonitrile and is converted by catalytic hydrogenation into hexamethylenediamine, one of the monomers used to produce nylon. The second monomer, adipic acid, is produced by oxidation of cyclohexane. Acetone cyanohydrin is an important intermediate in the production of methyl methacrylate, which in turn is used to manufacture polymethyl methacrylate.

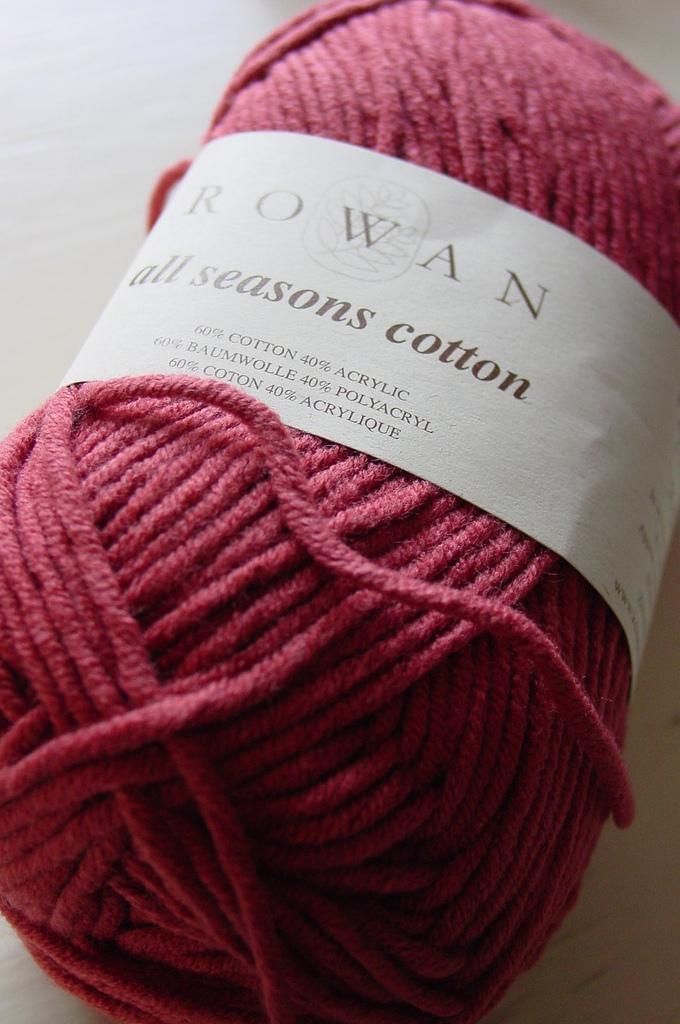
Polyacrylonitrile is used in knitting yarn

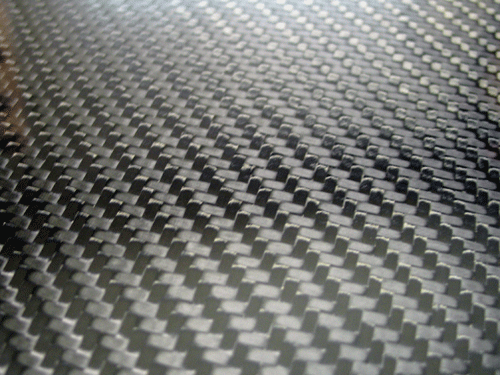
Carbon fibers are often made from polyacrylonitrile

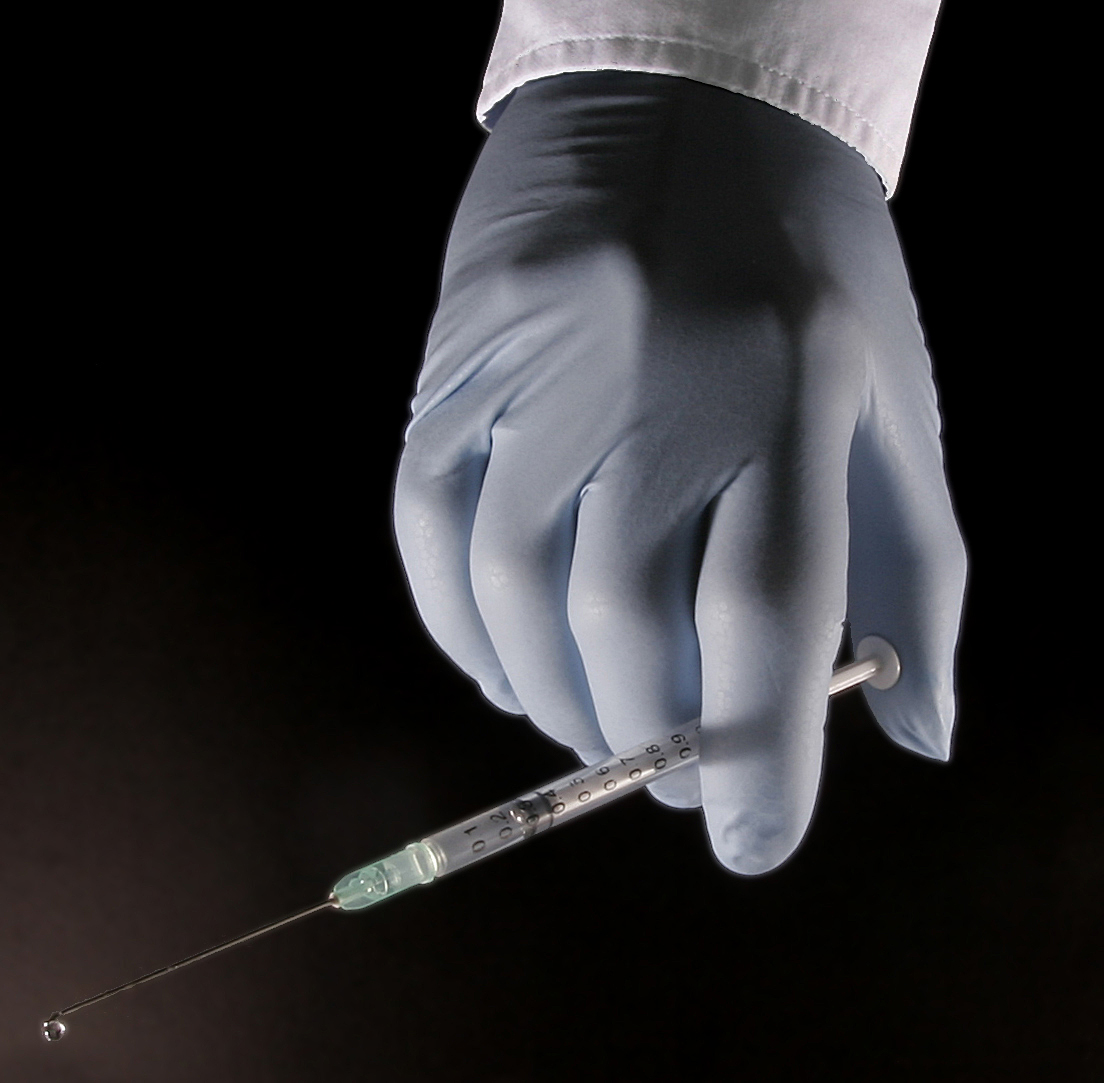
Protective gloves made from nitrile rubber

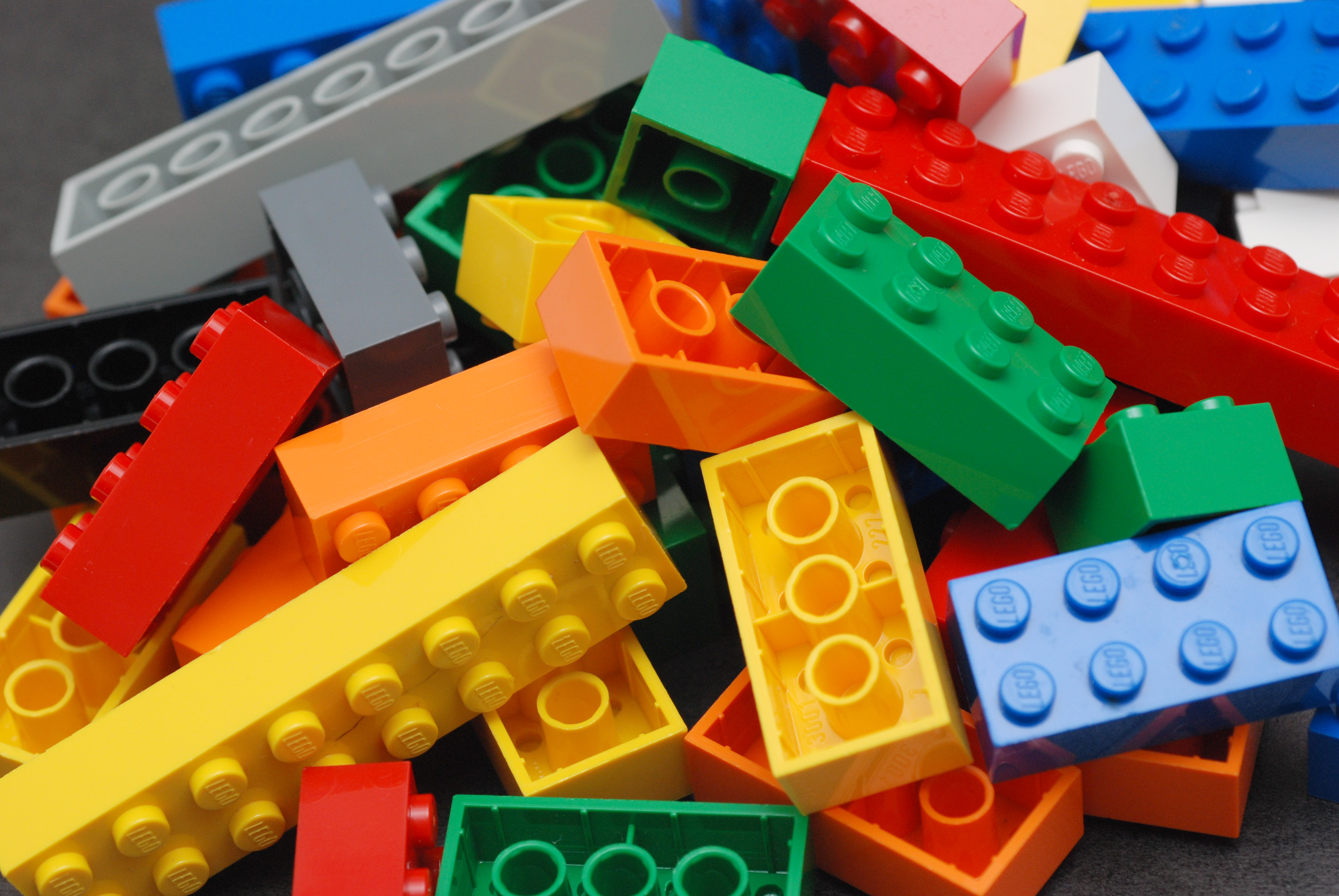
Lego bricks are made from acrylonitrile butadiene styrene copolymer (ABS)

The thermal decomposition of azobisisobutyronitrile (AIBN) and related compounds (e.g., azobis(cyclohexanecarbonitrile)) generates relatively stable radicals; accordingly, these compounds are used as radical initiators in radical reactions, particularly polymerizations.

=== Laboratory science ===
Acetonitrile is used as a solvent, particularly in the pharmaceutical industry. According to a market analysis, approximately 180,000 tons of acetonitrile were produced worldwide in 2022, of which around 70% was consumed by the pharmaceutical sector. It is also one of the most important solvents for analyses performed by high-performance liquid chromatography.

Nitrile groups can be incorporated into biomolecules as probes for infrared spectroscopic investigations.

The quinone DDQ, which contains two nitrile groups, is a widely used oxidizing agent.

Some nitriles serve as starting materials for the synthesis of pharmaceuticals. Ketoprofen is an anti-inflammatory agent approved in some EU countries; propionitrile is used in its industrial synthesis.

=== In pharmaceuticals ===
Nitriles occur in numerous classes of drugs. Over 30 nitrile-containing pharmaceuticals are currently marketed for a diverse variety of medicinal indications with more than 20 additional nitrile-containing leads in clinical development. Between 2010 and 2020, at least one drug containing a nitrile function was approved annually by the US Food and Drug Administration. The types of pharmaceuticals containing nitriles are diverse, from vildagliptin, an antidiabetic drug, to anastrozole, which is the gold standard in treating breast cancer. In many instances the nitrile mimics functionality present in substrates for enzymes, whereas in other cases the nitrile increases water solubility or decreases susceptibility to oxidative metabolism in the liver.

The nitrile group exhibits characteristic physicochemical properties that are important in drug design. Incorporation of a nitrile group into a molecule generally reduces its octanol-water partition coefficient or increases its aqueous solubility. This often favorably influences bioavailability, plasma half-life, and thus the duration of action of lipophilic compounds. In medicinal products, the nitrile group is typically metabolically stable.

Structurally, the nitrile group is isosteric (exhibiting a similar shape and electron distribution) to the carbonyl group, the hydroxy group, and the chlorine atom. It has a linear geometry and occupies very little space—approximately one eighth of the volume of a methyl group. It is therefore well suited to occupying narrow and deep cavities within the binding site of a target protein that are otherwise difficult to access. The principle pharmacodynamic interaction is a hydrogen bond between the electronegative nitrogen atom and a labile proton. For example, the nitrile group of the competitive PDE-3 inhibitor milrinone forms an affinity-relevant hydrogen bond via a histidine residue located at the binding site of these phosphodiesterases.

Nitriles can form a coordinative bond with calcium cations, essential to verapamil-type calcium antagonists. These agents physically clog the calcium channel, acting as a molecular glue between a glutamic acid residue in the selectivity filter and an inbound calcium ion.

Nitrile substituents also decrease the electron density of aromatic compounds through a strong inductive effect, useful to modulate π-π interactions between a drug and an aryl amino acid. Such π-π interactions are observed with the aromatase inhibitors letrozole and anastrozole, which act as antiestrogens and are used in breast cancer. Many androgen receptor antagonists contain a markedly electron-deficient aromatic ring, which is particularly important for supramolecular receptor binding. In bicalutamide, enzalutamide, and other analogs used to treat prostate cancer, a nitrile group contributes to this electronic effect.

Nitriles are weak electrophiles, and can, under appropriate conditions, add to serine or cysteine residues, forming (respectively) an imino ester or thioimidate. This mechanism applies to the dipeptidyl peptidase 4 inhibitor vildagliptin used in diabetes mellitus, as well as to saxagliptin. The antibacterial antibiotic cefmetazole also acts as a covalent inhibitor, in this case targeting a bacterial peptidase. The calcium sensitizer levosimendan is presumed to react with the cardiac troponin protein complex.

In certain cases, nitrile groups exert their effect primarily through steric interactions (i.e., spatial complementarity) by forming van der Waals forces with amino acid residues. This applies to the tyrosine kinase inhibitor bosutinib, which is used in chronic myeloid leukemia. Crystal structures have been reported in which bosutinib is complexed with various tyrosine kinases. Inhibitors of reverse transcriptase, such as Etravirin and Rilpivirin, are used in combination therapies against HIV. The acrylonitrile substructure of rilpivirine penetrates an aromatic cage composed of tyrosine, phenylalanine, and tryptophan, as demonstrated by the corresponding three-dimensional structure published in 2008. The serotonin reuptake inhibitor citalopram, used in the treatment of depression, was the most frequently prescribed psychotropic drug in Germany in 2016, with 290 million defined daily doses. The nitrile group of escitalopram exhibits optimal complementarity to both the central and an additional allosteric binding site of the transporter protein, as evidenced by crystal structure analysis.

Periciazine, an antipsychotic studied in the treatment of opiate dependence

Cefmetazole, an antbacterial

Citalopram, an antidepressant drug of the selective serotonin reuptake inhibitor (SSRI) class

Cyamemazine, an antipsychotic drug

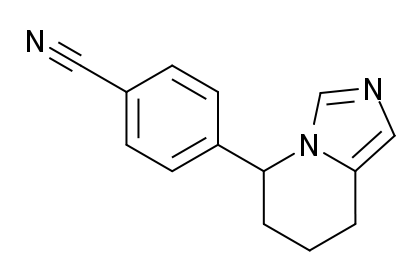
Fadrozole, an aromatase inhibitor for the treatment of breast cancer

Letrozole, an oral nonsteroidal aromatase inhibitor for the treatment of certain breast cancers

Levosimendan, a calcium sensitizer

Milrinone, a PDE-3 inhibitor

Rilpivirine, a reverse transcriptase inhibitor for HIV treatment

Saxagliptin

=== Other uses ===
Geranyl nitrile is used as a fragrance

A few dozen nitriles are used as fragrance ingredients in cosmetics. These include cinnamic acid nitrile, dodecanitrile, benzonitrile, and geranyl nitrile. Some nitriles possess fragrances similar to those of the corresponding aldehydes but are considerably more stable, making them suitable substitutes. For example, geranyl nitrile provides a citrus note and, unlike the structurally analogous citral, is resistant to oxidation.

Various nitriles are employed as pesticides. Cyano groups are present in certain pyrethroids. Pyrethroids are carboxylic acid esters; by using 3-phenoxymandelonitrile as the alcohol component, as in deltamethrin and cypermethrin, a class of particularly potent derivatives has been developed. Azoxystrobin became the world's best-selling agricultural fungicide in 1999, only a few years after its introduction, with sales exceeding 400 million US dollars, and it has retained its market significance for more than 15 years, remaining the leading fungicide in 2016. Azoxystrobin was developed on the basis of the naturally occurring strobilurin. Key structural modifications relative to the parent compound include replacement of double bonds with aromatic rings and introduction of a cyano group onto the pre-existing ring system. A widely used nitrile-containing insecticide is fipronil.

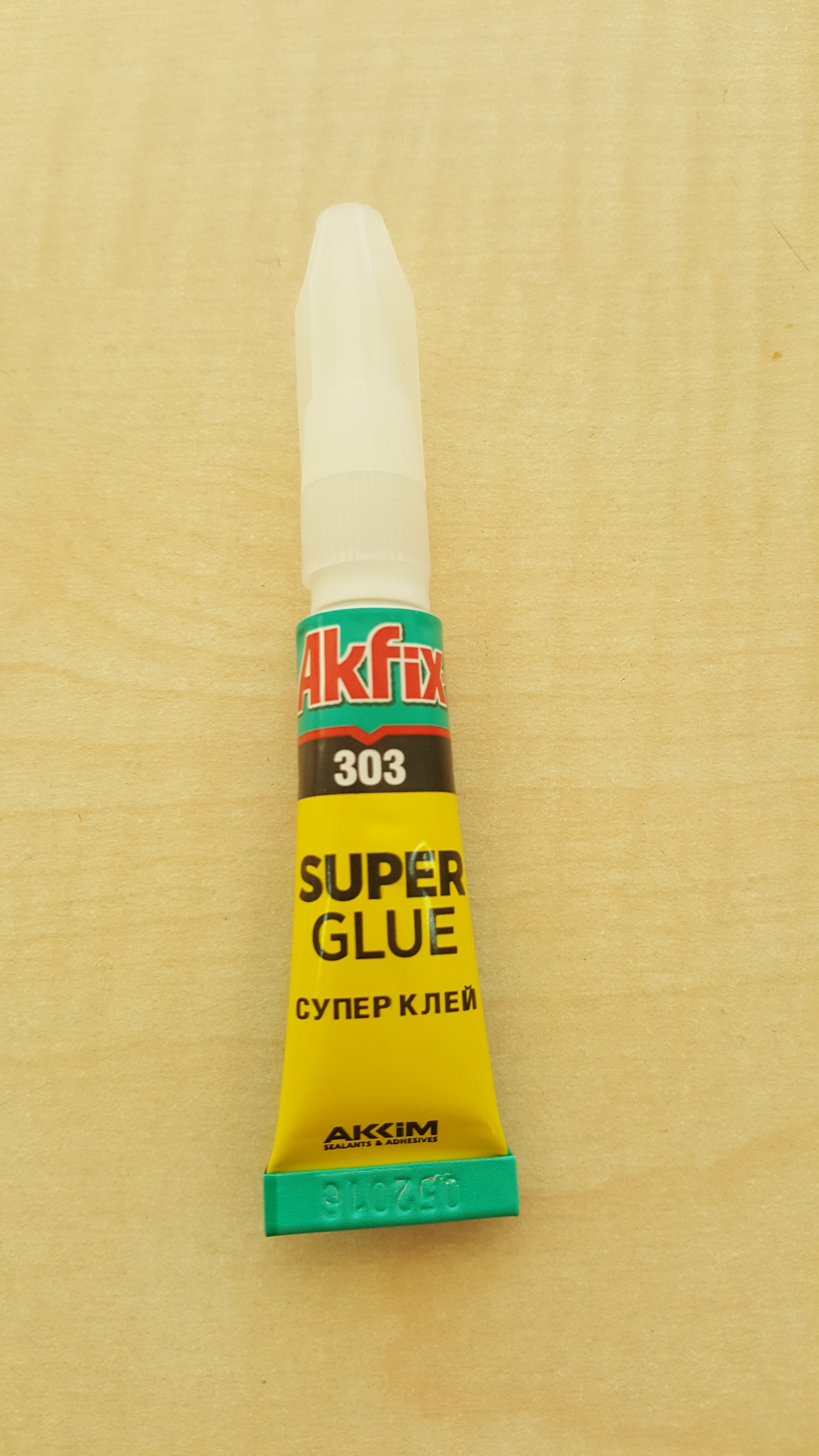
tube with cyanoacrylate adhesive and structure of ethyl cyanoacrylate, which is often used in cyanoacrylate adhesives

Cyanoacrylates are used as adhesives because, as single-component formulations, they cure rapidly under ambient conditions and can bond a wide range of materials. By far the most widely used compound in this field is 2-cyanoacrylic acid ethyl ester, while 2-cyanoacrylic acid methyl ester and allyl cyanoacrylate are used to a lesser extent. Cyanoacrylate adhesives are also applied in medicine for wound closure as an alternative to suturing. However, short-chain alkyl esters (e.g., methyl cyanoacrylate) frequently cause adverse effects, particularly inflammation; therefore, different compounds are employed in medical applications than in technical uses. In particular, butyl cyanoacrylate and 2-octyl cyanoacrylate are predominantly used.

Nitriles are used as electrolyte additives in lithium batteries. For example, the addition of 1,3,6-hexanetricarbonitrile leads to a significant performance improvement compared with a corresponding battery without such an additive. The mechanism of action of nitrile additives has not yet been fully elucidated.

== See also ==
- Protonated nitriles: Nitrilium
- Deprotonated nitriles: Nitrile anion
- Cyanocarbon
- Nitrile ylide
