= Karl Wilhelm Rosenmund =

German chemist (1884–1965)

Karl Wilhelm Louis Rosenmund
- Born: 15 December 1884; Berlin, Germany
- Died: 8 February 1965 (aged 80); Kiel, Germany
- Education: University of Berlin
- Known for: Rosenmund reduction Rosenmund-Kuhnhenn method Rosenmund–von Braun reaction
- Scientific career
- Doctoral advisor: Otto Paul Hermann Diels

Karl Wilhelm Louis Rosenmund (15 December 1884 – 8 February 1965) was a German chemist. He was born in Berlin and died in Kiel.

Rosenmund studied chemistry and received his Ph.D. 1906 from University of Berlin for his work with Otto Diels. He discovered the Rosenmund reduction, which is the reduction of acid chlorides to aldehydes over palladium on barium sulfate as catalyst (Lindlar catalyst). The Rosenmund–von Braun reaction, the conversion of an aryl bromide to an aryl nitrile is also named after him. Rosenmund-Kuhnhenn method is suitable for the determination of iodine value in conjugated systems (ASTM D1541).
