= Oxathiazolones =

1,3,4-Oxathiazol-2-one
- 1,3,4-Oxathiazol-2-one

Names
- Preferred IUPAC name 2H-1,3,4-Oxathiazol-2-one

Identifiers
CAS Number	64487-69-0
3D model (JSmol)	Interactive image
ChemSpider	11632795
PubChem CID	22114966
UNII	FNP4S332QL
- InChI: InChI=1S/C2HNO2S/c4-2-5-1-3-6-2/h1H Key: PJCFLHUCYONHAS-UHFFFAOYSA-N; InChI=1/C2HNO2S/c4-2-5-1-3-6-2/h1H Key: PJCFLHUCYONHAS-UHFFFAOYAS
- SMILES: O=C1OC=NS1

Properties
Chemical formula	C_{2}HNO_{2}S
Molar mass	103.10 g·mol^{−1}
- Except where otherwise noted, data are given for materials in their standard state (at 25 °C [77 °F], 100 kPa). Infobox references

The oxathiazolones are a family of heterocyclic compounds in which the parent derivative has the molecular formula C_{2}HNO_{2}S and for which multiple isomers are known. The two known isomers with the highest profile in the literature are 1,3,4-oxathiazol-2-one and 1,4,2-oxathiazol-5-one.

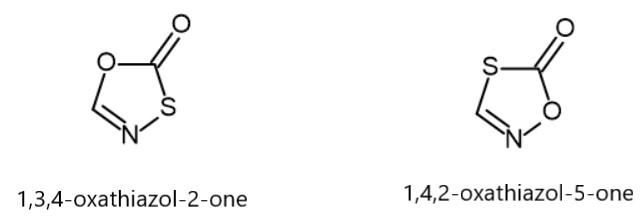

== 1,3,4-Oxathiazol-2-one ==
=== Molecular and electronic structure ===
1,3,4-Oxathiaol-2-one derivatives are planar heterocycles that prefer co-planarity with aromatic substituents. It has been proposed that the π system of the ring consists of CNS and CO_{2} "π islands" that prefer coplanarity to enhance inter-ring π conjugation.

=== Synthesis ===
The traditional route for 1,3,4-oxathiazol-2-one synthesis is via 1,3 dipolar cycloaddition, where chlorocarbonylsulfenyl chloride and amide are heated together in an appropriate solvent. Appropriate solvents must dissolve the amide. Typically toluene or chloroform is used. A wide variety of amides have been used is the synthesis of 1,3,4-oxathiazol-2-one yielding various derivatives. Variations in this procedure have included doing the reaction under an inert atmosphere, adding chlorocarbonylsulfenyl chloride drop-wise, and varying the ratio of chlorocarbonylsulfenyl chloride to amide. Variations in procedure may be due to local preferences or substituent effects.

=== Reactions ===
==== Decarboxylation leading to isothiazole derivatives ====
1,3,4-Oxathiazol-2-one derivatives are commonly used in thermal decarboxylation reactions to generate the corresponding derivative of the short-lived nitrile sulfide which may be trapped by 1,3-dipolar cycloaddition reactions to give heterocycles in low to high yields depending on the nature of the substituent groups.

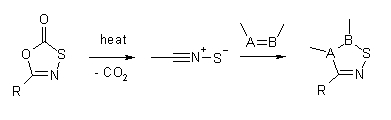

The intermediate can be trapped with a suitable electron deficient dipolarophile to give stable heterocycles such as isothiazole (seen below).

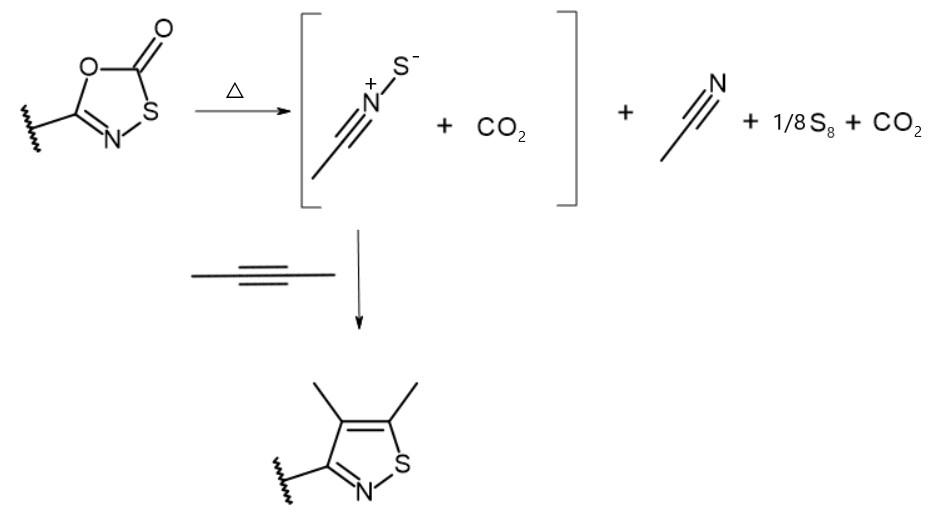

==== Other decarboxylation reactions ====
The intermediate has been successfully trapped using other dipolarophiles including nitriles, alkenes, and phosphaalkenes.

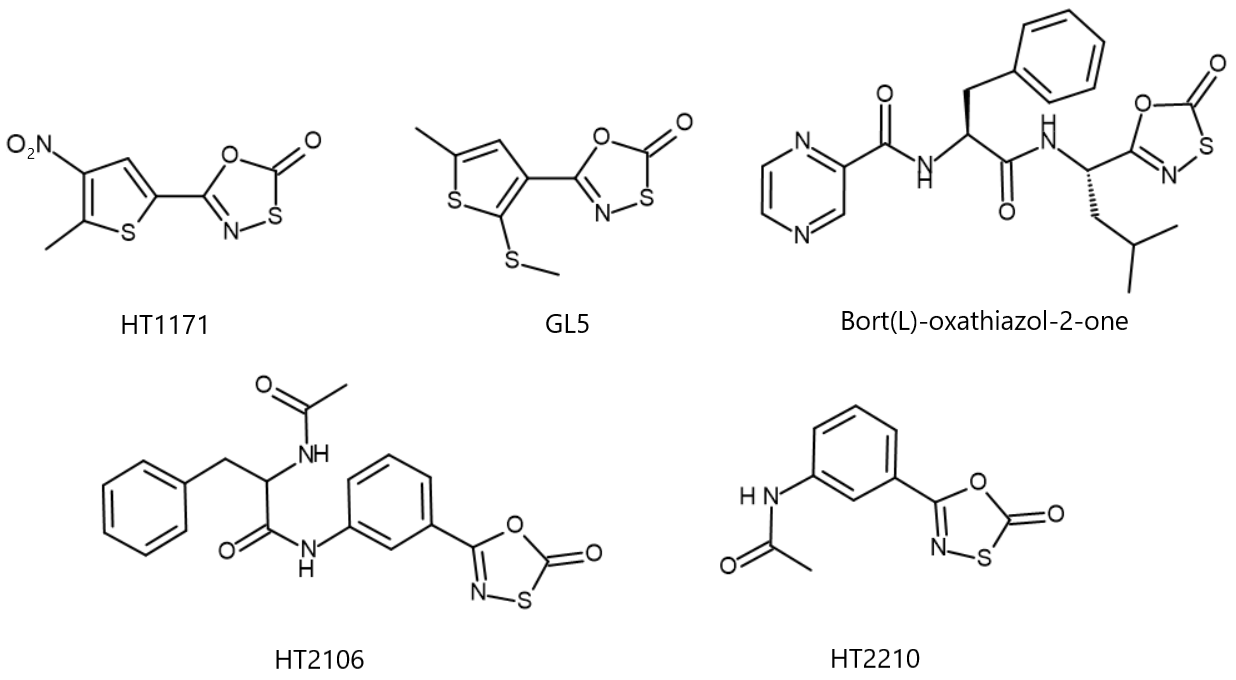
Some biologically significant 1,3,4-oxathiazol-2-one compounds (HT1171 and GL5; bort(L)-oxathiazol-2-one; HT2210 and HT2106.

=== Biological significance and applications ===
Some 1,3,4-oxathiazol-2-one heterocycles have demonstrated selective inhibition of proteasomes in Mycobacterum tuberculosis and humans. Oxathiazolones HT1171 and GL5 (right) selectively inhibited the M. tuberculosis 26S proteasome and were over 1000-fold less effective on the human proteasome even in high concentrations. Various 5‐styryl‐oxathiazol‐2‐one heterocycles have also been tested as anti-tubercular agents because of their ability to inhibit the M. tuberculosis 26S proteasome.

A Bortezomib derived 1,3,4-oxathiazol-2-one (bort(L)-oxathiazol-2-one, right) selectively acts against the human proteasome rather than bacterial proteasomes, much like Bortezomib. HT2210 and HT2106 (right) were found to have similar effects. Human proteasome inhibition is useful in the treatment of cancer, neurodegenerative disorders, and inflammation.

== See also ==
- Oxazolone, an analog without the sulfur atom.
- Thiazole and isothiazole, analogues without the carbonyl group or oxygen atom.
- Oxazole and isoxazole, analogues without the carbonyl group or sulfur atom.
