= Nitrile anion =

Nitrile anions is jargon from the organic product resulting from the deprotonation of alkylnitriles. The proton(s) α to the nitrile group are sufficiently acidic that they undergo deprotonation by strong bases, usually lithium-derived. The products are not anions but covalent organolithium complexes. Regardless, these organolithium compounds are reactive toward various electrophiles.

Although nitrile anions are functionally similar to enolates, the extra multiple bond in nitrile anions provides them with a ketene-like geometry. Additionally, deprotonated cyanohydrins can act as masked acyl anions, giving products impossible to access with enolates alone.

== Generation of nitrile anions ==
The pK_{a}s of nitriles span a wide range—at least 20 pK_{a} units. Unstabilized nitriles require either alkali metal amide bases (such as NaNH_{2}) or metal alkyls (such as butyllithium) for effective deprotonation. In the latter case, competitive addition of the alkyl group to the nitrile takes place.

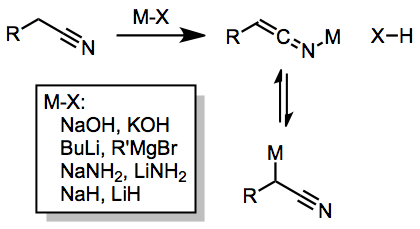

Arylacetonitriles (e.g. phenylacetonitrile) are sufficiently acidic to undergo deprotonation with aqueous base, e.g., under phase-transfer catalysis. Nitrile anions can also be involved in Michael-type additions to activated double bonds and vinylation reactions with a limited number of polarized, unhindered acetylene derivatives.

Nitrile anions also arise by conjugate additions to α,β-unsaturated nitriles, reduction, and transmetallation.

== Alkylation of nitrile anions ==
Nitrile anions are alkylated by alkyl halides.

The primary difficulty for alkylation reactions employing nitrile anions is over-alkylation. In the alkylation of acetonitrile, for instance, yields of monoalkylated product are low in most cases. Two exceptions are alkylations with epoxides (the nearby negative charge of the opened epoxide wards off further alkylation) and alkylations with cyanomethylcopper(I) species. Side reactions may also present a problem; concentrations of the nitrile anion must be high in order to mitigate processes involving self-condensation, such as the Thorpe–Ziegler reaction. Other important side reactions include elimination of the alkyl cyanide product or alkyl halide starting material and amidine formation.

The cyclization of ω-epoxy-1-nitriles provides an interesting example of how stereoelectronic factors may override steric factors in intramolecular substitution reactions. In the cyclization of 1, for instance, only the cyclopropane isomer 2 is observed. This is attributed to better orbital overlap in the S_{N}2 transition state for cyclization. 1,1-disubstituted and tetrasubstituted epoxides also follow this principle.

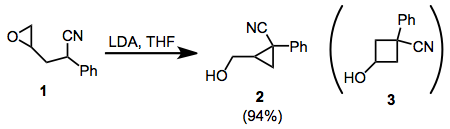

Conjugated nitriles containing γ hydrogens may be deprotonated at the γ position to give resonance-stabilized anions. These intermediates almost always react with α selectitivity in alkylation reactions, the exception to the rule being anions of ortho-tolyl nitriles.

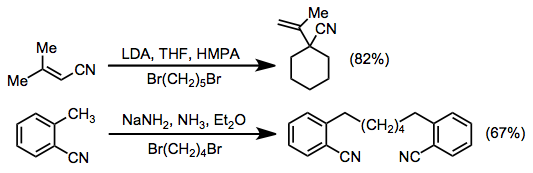

Formation of cyanohydrins from carbonyl compounds renders the former carbonyl carbon acidic. After protection of the hydroxyl group with an acyl or silyl group, cyanohydrins can function essentially as masked acyl anions. Because ester protecting groups are base labile, mild bases must be employed with ester-protected cyanohydrins. α-(Dialkylamino)nitriles can also be used in this context.

Examples of arylation and acylation reactions are shown below. Although intermolecular arylations using nitrile anions result in modest yields, the intramolecular procedure efficiently gives four-, five-, and six-membered benzo-fused rings.

Acylation can be accomplished using a wide variety of acyl electrophiles, including carbonates, chloroformates, esters, anyhdrides, and acid chlorides. In these reactions, two equivalents of base are used to drive the reaction towards acylated product—the acylated product is more acidic than the starting material.

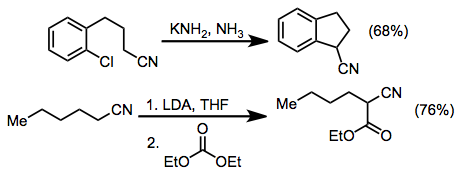

=== Polyalkylation ===
Polyalkylation is a significant problem for primary or secondary nitriles; however, a number of solutions to this problem exist. Alkylation of cyanoacetates followed by decarboxylation provides one solution.

Polyanions of nitriles can also be generated by multiple deprotonations, and these species produce polyalkylated products in the presence of alkyl electrophiles.

== Synthetic applications ==
Alkylation of a nitrile anion followed by reductive decyanation was employed in the synthesis of (Z)-9-dodecen-1-yl acetate, the sex pheromone of Paralobesia viteana.

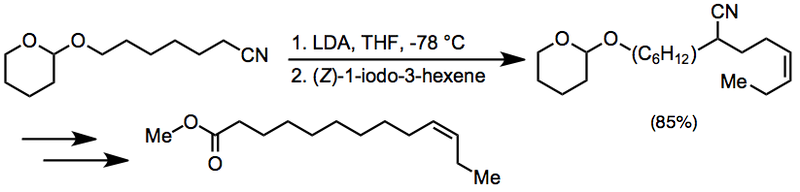
