= Copper(I) cyanide =

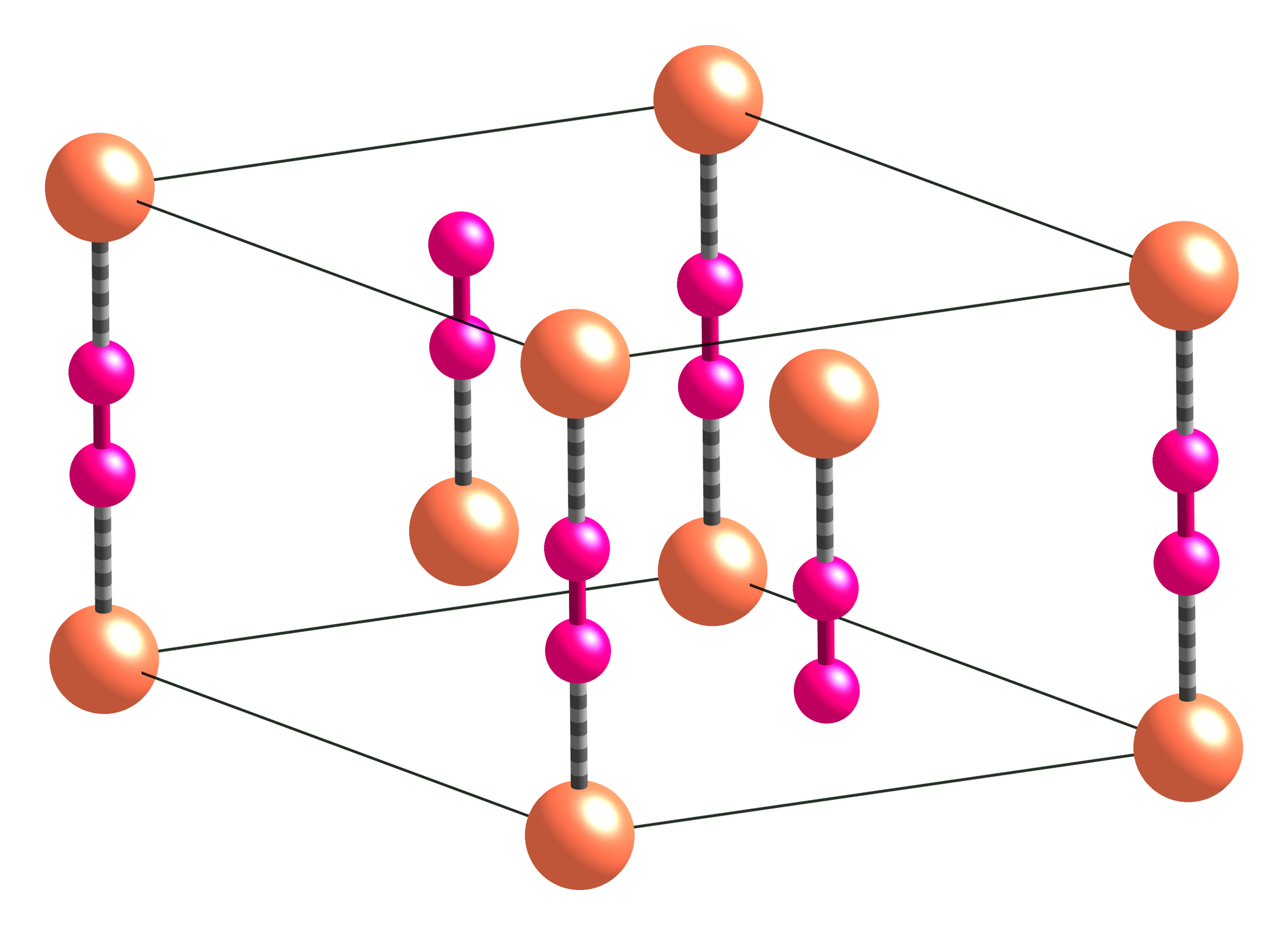

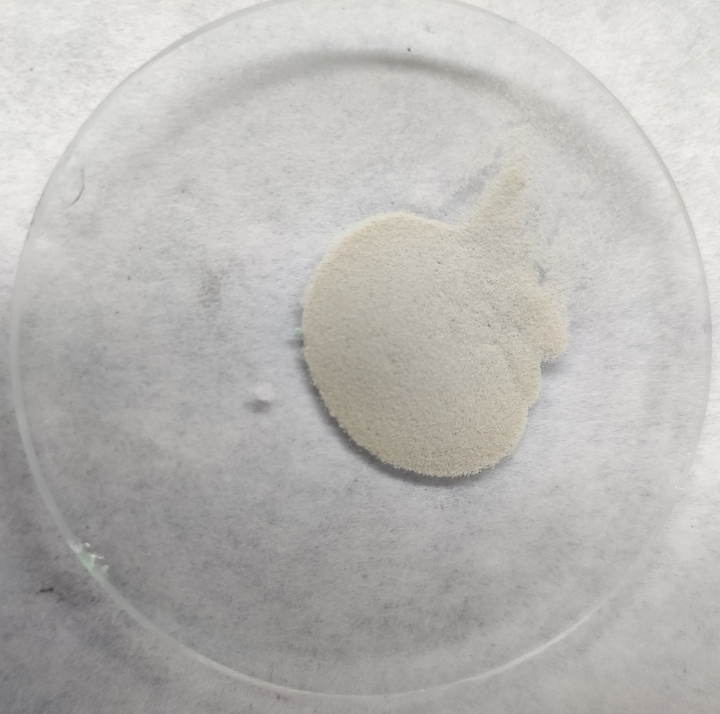

Names
- IUPAC name Copper(I) cyanide
- Other names Cuprous cyanide, copper cyanide, cupricin

Identifiers
CAS Number	544-92-3
3D model (JSmol)	Interactive image
ChemSpider	10543
ECHA InfoCard	100.008.076
EC Number	208-883-6
PubChem CID	11009
RTECS number	GL7150000
UNII	534K22856J
UN number	1587
CompTox Dashboard (EPA)	DTXSID7023986
- InChI: InChI=1S/CN.Cu/c1-2;/q-1;+1 Key: DOBRDRYODQBAMW-UHFFFAOYSA-N; InChI=1/CN.Cu/c1-2;/q-1;+1 Key: DOBRDRYODQBAMW-UHFFFAOYAI
- SMILES: [Cu+].[C-]#N

Properties
Chemical formula	CuCN
Molar mass	89.563 g/mol
Appearance	off-white / pale yellow powder
Density	2.92 g/cm^{3}
Melting point	474 °C (885 °F; 747 K)
Solubility in water	negligible
Solubility product (K_{sp})	3.47×10^{−20}
Solubility	insoluble in ethanol, cold dilute acids; soluble in NH_{3}, KCN

Structure
Crystal structure	monoclinic

Hazards
- GHS labelling
Pictograms	(GHS06: Toxic) (GHS09: Environmental hazard)
Signal word	Danger
Hazard statements	H300, H310, H330, H410
Precautionary statements	P260, P262, P264, P270, P271, P273, P280, P284, P301+P310, P302+P350, P304+P340, P310, P320, P321, P330, P361, P363, P391, P403+P233, P405, P501
NFPA 704 (fire diamond)	4 0 0
Flash point	Non-flammable
- NIOSH (US health exposure limits)
PEL (Permissible)	TWA 1 mg/m^{3} (as Cu)
REL (Recommended)	TWA 1 mg/m^{3} (as Cu)
IDLH (Immediate danger)	TWA 100 mg/m^{3} (as Cu)
Safety data sheet (SDS)	Oxford MSDS
- Except where otherwise noted, data are given for materials in their standard state (at 25 °C [77 °F], 100 kPa). verify (what is ?) Infobox references

Copper(I) cyanide (cuprous cyanide) is an inorganic compound with the formula CuCN. This off-white solid occurs in two polymorphs; impure samples can be green due to the presence of Cu(II) impurities. The compound is useful as a catalyst, in electroplating copper, and as a reagent in the preparation of nitriles.

== Structure ==
Copper cyanide is a coordination polymer. It exists in two polymorphs both of which contain -[Cu-CN]- chains made from linear copper(I) centres linked by cyanide bridges. In the high-temperature polymorph, HT-CuCN, which is isostructural with AgCN, the linear chains pack on a hexagonal lattice and adjacent chains are off set by +/- 1/3 c, Figure 1. In the low-temperature polymorph, LT-CuCN, the chains deviate from linearity and pack into rippled layers which pack in an AB fashion with chains in adjacent layers rotated by 49 °, Figure 2.

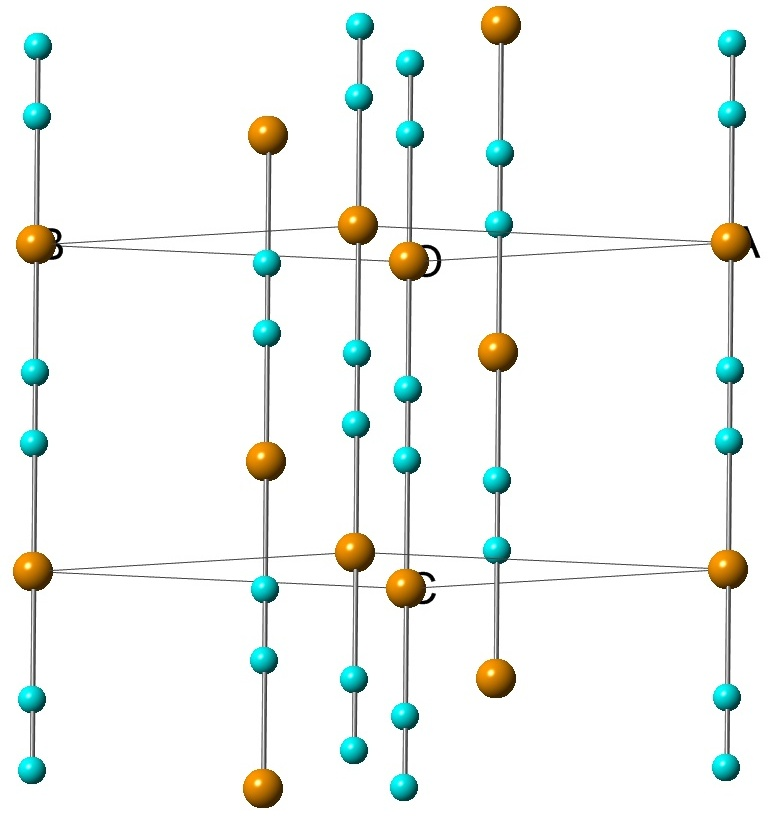
Figure 1: The structure of HT-CuCN showing the chains running along the c axis. Key: copper = orange and cyan = head-to-tail disordered cyanide groups.

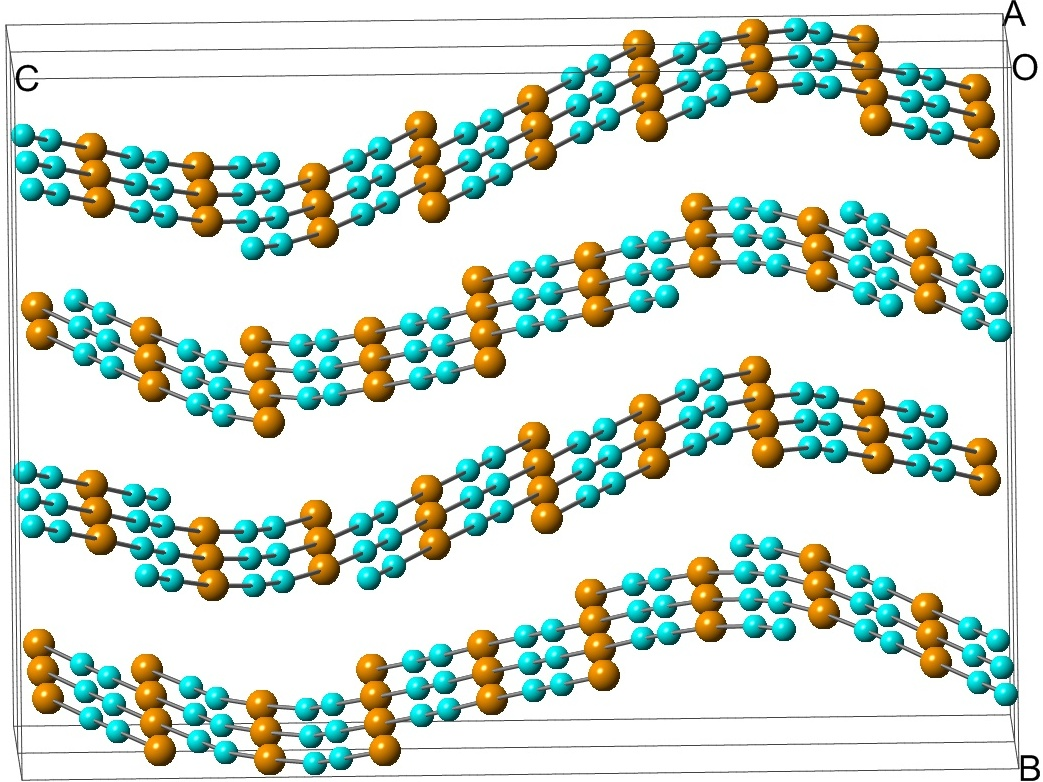
Figure 2: The structure of LT-CuCN showing sheets of chains stacking in an ABAB fashion. Key: copper = orange and cyan = head-to-tail disordered cyanide groups.

LT-CuCN can be converted to HT-CuCN by heating to 563 K in an inert atmosphere. In both polymorphs the copper to carbon and copper to nitrogen bond lengths are ~1.85 Å and bridging cyanide groups show head-to-tail disorder.

== Preparation ==
Cuprous cyanide is commercially available and is supplied as the low-temperature polymorph. It can be prepared by the reduction of copper(II) sulfate with sodium bisulfite at 60 °C, followed by the addition of sodium cyanide to precipitate pure LT-CuCN as a pale yellow powder.

2 CuSO_{4} + NaHSO_{3} + H_{2}O + 2 NaCN → 2 CuCN + 3 NaHSO_{4}

On addition of sodium bisulfite the copper sulfate solution turns from blue to green, at which point the sodium cyanide is added. The reaction is performed under mildly acidic conditions. Copper cyanide has historically been prepared by treating copper(II) sulfate with sodium cyanide, in this redox reaction, copper(I) cyanide forms together with cyanogen:

2 CuSO_{4} + 4 NaCN → 2 CuCN + (CN)_{2} + 2 Na_{2}SO_{4}

Because this synthetic route produces cyanogen, uses two equivalents of sodium cyanide per equivalent of CuCN made and the resulting copper cyanide is impure it is not the industrial production method. The similarity of this reaction to that between copper sulfate and sodium iodide to form copper(I) iodide is one example of cyanide ions acting as a pseudohalide. It also explains why cupric cyanide (copper(II) cyanide, Cu(CN)_{2}), has not been synthesised.

== Reactions ==
Copper cyanide is insoluble in water but rapidly dissolves in solutions containing CN^{−} to form [Cu(CN)_{3}]^{2−} and [Cu(CN)_{4}]^{3−}, which exhibit trigonal planar and tetrahedral coordination geometry, respectively. These complexes contrast with those of silver and gold cyanides, which form [M(CN)_{2}]^{−} ions in solution. The coordination polymer KCu(CN)_{2} contains [Cu(CN)_{2}]^{−} units, which link together forming helical anionic chains.

Copper cyanide is also soluble in concentrated aqueous ammonia, pyridine and N-methylpyrrolidone.

== Applications ==
Cuprous cyanide is used for electroplating copper.

=== Organic synthesis ===
CuCN is a prominent reagent in organocopper chemistry. It reacts with organolithium reagents to form "mixed cuprates" with the formulas Li[RCuCN] and Li_{2}[R_{2}CuCN]. The use of CuCN revolutionized the deployment of simpler organocopper reagents of the type CuR and LiCuR_{2}, the so-called Gilman reagents. In the presence of cyanide, these mixed cuprates are more readily purified and more stable.

The mixed cuprates Li[RCuCN] and Li_{2}[R_{2}CuCN] function as sources of the carbanions R^{−}, but with diminished reactivity compared to the parent organolithium reagent. Thus they are useful for conjugate additions and some displacement reactions.

CuCN also forms silyl and stannyl reagents, which are used as sources of R_{3}Si^{−} and R_{3}Sn^{−}.

CuCN is used in the conversion of aryl halides to nitriles in the Rosenmund–von Braun reaction.

CuCN has also been introduced as a mild electrophilic source of nitrile under oxidative conditions, for instance secondary amines as well as sulfides and disulfides have been efficiently cyanated using this methodology. This last methodology has been then introduced in a domino 3 component reaction, leading to 2-aminobenthiazoles.
