= Aliphatic aldoxime dehydratase =

Identifiers
- EC no.: 4.99.1.5

Databases
- BRENDA: enzyme data
- ExPASy: NiceZyme view
- KEGG: enzyme entry
- MetaCyc: metabolic pathway
- Rhea: reactions
- PDB structures: RCSB PDB PDBe PDBsum
Search
- PMC: articles
- PubMed: articles
- NCBI: proteins

In enzymology, an aliphatic aldoxime dehydratase (EC 4.99.1.5) is an enzyme that catalyzes the chemical reaction

an aliphatic aldoxime $\rightleftharpoons$ an aliphatic nitrile + H_{2}O

This dehydratase converts an aldoxime on an aliphatic substrate to a nitrile as the product structure with water as byproduct.

This enzyme belongs to the family of lyases, specifically the "catch-all" class of lyases that do not fit into any other sub-class. The systematic name of this enzyme class is aliphatic aldoxime hydro-lyase (aliphatic-nitrile-forming). Other names in common use include OxdA, and aliphatic aldoxime hydro-lyase.

== See also ==
- D-amino acid oxidase, sometimes also referred to as OXDA
