= Von Braun reaction =

Chemical reaction

von Braun reaction
Named after	Julius von Braun
Reaction type	Substitution reaction

Reaction
tertiary amine
+
cyanogen bromide
↓
organocyanamide

The von Braun reaction is an organic reaction in which a tertiary amine reacts with cyanogen bromide to form an organocyanamide. An example is the reaction of N,N-dimethyl-1-naphthylamine:

These days, most chemists have replaced cyanogen bromide reagent with chloroethyl chloroformate as the reagent of choice instead for the demethylation of tertiary amines. It appears as though Olofson et al. was the first chemist to have reported this.

== Reaction mechanism ==
The reaction mechanism consists of two nucleophilic substitutions: the amine is the first nucleophile displacing the bromine atom which then acts as the second nucleophile. In following the mechanism is described using trimethylamine as example:

First, the trimethylamine reacts with the cyanogen bromide to form a quaternary ammonium salt, which in the next step reacts by splitting off bromomethane to give the dimethylcyanamide. This is a bimolecular nucleophilic substitution (S_{N}2).

== See also ==
- von Braun amide degradation
