= Ritter reaction =

Chemical reaction

| Named after | John J. Ritter |
| Reaction type | Addition reaction |

Identifiers
| Organic Chemistry Portal | ritter-reaction |
| RSC ontology ID | RXNO:0000058 |

The Ritter reaction (sometimes called the Ritter amidation) is a chemical reaction that transforms a nitrile into an N-alkyl amide using various electrophilic alkylating reagents. The original reaction formed the alkylating agent using an alkene in the presence of a strong acid.

== Mechanism and scope ==
The Ritter reaction proceeds by the electrophilic addition of either a carbenium ion or covalent species to the nitrile. The resulting nitrilium ion is hydrolyzed to the desired amide.

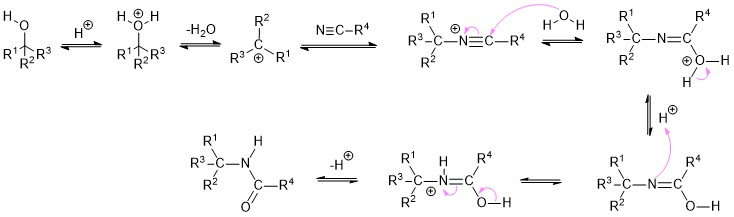

Primary, secondary, tertiary, and benzylic alcohols, as well as tert-butyl acetate, also successfully react with nitriles in the presence of strong acids to form amides via the Ritter reaction. A wide range of nitriles can be used. In particular, cyanide can be used to prepare formamides, which are useful precursors to isocyanides, or may also be hydrolysed to give amines. In the synthesis of 2-acrylamido-2-methylpropane sulfonic acid, the strong acid (sulfuric acid) also reacts to give a sulfonate group.

== Applications ==
A large scale application of the Ritter reaction is in the synthesis of tert-octylamine, by way of the intermediate formamide. This process was originally described by Ritter in 1948, and an estimated 10,000 tons/y (year: 2000) of this and related lipophilic amines are prepared in this way. Otherwise, the Ritter reaction is most useful in the formation of amines and amides of pharmaceutical interest. Real world applications include Merck's industrial-scale synthesis of anti-HIV drug Crixivan (indinavir); the production of the falcipain-2 inhibitor PK-11195; the synthesis of the alkaloid aristotelone; and synthesis of Amantadine, an antiviral and antiparkinsonian drug. Other applications of the Ritter reaction include synthesis of dopamine receptor ligands and production of racemic amphetamine from allylbenzene and methyl cyanide.

The Ritter reaction is inferior to most amination methods because it cogenerates substantial amounts of salts. Illustrative is the conversion of isobutylene to tert-butylamine using HCN and sulfuric acid followed by base neutralization. The weight of the salt byproduct is greater than the weight of the amine.

In the laboratory, the Ritter reaction suffers from the necessity of an extremely strong acid catalyst and the risk of a hazardous thermal runaway. Other methods have been proposed in order to promote carbocation formation, including photocatalytic electron transfer or direct photolysis.

== History ==
The reaction is named after John J. Ritter, who supervised the Ph.D. thesis work of P. Paul Minieri.

- Ritter, John J.; Minieri, P. Paul (1948). "A New Reaction of Nitriles. I. Amides from Alkenes and Mononitriles". Journal of the American Chemical Society. 70 (12): 4045–8. Bibcode:1948JAChS..70.4045R. doi:10.1021/ja01192a022. PMID 18105932.
- Ritter, John J.; Kalish, Joseph (1948). "A New Reaction of Nitriles. II. Synthesis of t-Carbinamines". Journal of the American Chemical Society. 70 (12): 4048–50. Bibcode:1948JAChS..70.4048R. doi:10.1021/ja01192a023. PMID 18105933.
- Zil'berman, E. N. (1960). "Some reactions of nitriles with the formation of a new nitrogen–carbon bond". Russian Chemical Reviews. 29 (6): 331–340. Bibcode:1960RuCRv..29..331Z. doi:10.1070/RC1960v029n06ABEH001235. S2CID 250896801.
