= Streptomyces regensis =

Scientific classification
- Domain: Bacteria
- Kingdom: Bacillati
- Phylum: Actinomycetota
- Class: Actinomycetes
- Order: Streptomycetales
- Family: Streptomycetaceae
- Genus: Streptomyces
- Species: S. regensis

Binomial name
- Streptomyces regensis Gupta et al. 1963

Type strain
- ATCC 27461, BCRC 11890, CBS 749.72, CCRC 11890, DSM 40551

Species of bacterium

Streptomyces regensis is a bacterium species from the genus of Streptomyces. Streptomyces regensis produces actinomycin and cyanohydrin phosphonate.

== See also ==
- List of Streptomyces species
