= Ytterbium(III) cyanide =

Identifiers
CAS Number	39705-70-9
3D model (JSmol)	Interactive image
ChemSpider	8140497
PubChem CID	9964904
- InChI: InChI=1S/3CN.Yb/c3*1-2;/q3*-1;+3 Key: LRDYTKPNLKOGSS-UHFFFAOYSA-N
- SMILES: [Yb+3].[C-]#N.[C-]#N.[C-]#N

Properties
Chemical formula	Yb(CN)_{3}
Appearance	white solid
- Except where otherwise noted, data are given for materials in their standard state (at 25 °C [77 °F], 100 kPa). Infobox references

Ytterbium(III) cyanide is an inorganic compound with the chemical formula Yb(CN)_{3}.

== Preparation ==
Ytterbium(III) cyanide can be obtained by reacting ytterbium n-butylide or ytterbium isopropoxide and trimethylsilyl cyanide in an anhydrous solvent. Ytterbium(III) cyanide can also be obtained by reacting lithium cyanide and ytterbium(III) bromide, but the generated lithium bromide is difficult to completely remove.
