= Kolbe nitrile synthesis =

Chemical reaction used to prepare alkyl nitriles

Named after	Hermann Kolbe
Reaction type	Substitution reaction

Identifiers
Organic Chemistry Portal	kolbe-nitrile-synthesis

The Kolbe nitrile synthesis, named for Hermann Kolbe, is a method for the preparation of alkyl nitriles by reaction of the corresponding alkyl halide with a metal cyanide. A side product for this reaction is the formation of an isonitrile because the cyanide ion is an ambident nucleophile.
$$\ce{\underset{alkyl\ halide}{R-X} + \underset{cyanide\ ion}{CN^\ominus} -> \underset{alkyl\ nitrile}{R-C{\equiv}N} + \underset{alkyl\ isonitrile}{R-\overset\oplus N{\equiv}C^\ominus}}$$
The ratio of product isomers depends on the solvent and the reaction mechanism, and can be roughly predicted by Kornblum's rule. Conditions conducive to free cyanide ions (alkali counterion, polar aprotic solvents) tend to give nitriles, whereas cyanometalate and hydrogen cyanide intermediates generally react to form isonitriles.

The reaction occurs particularly well in dimethyl sulfoxide (DMSO) solvent, as DMSO enables harsher conditions for cyanidation of sterically hindered electrophiles (secondary and neopentyl halides) without rearrangement side-reactions.

== See also ==
- Rosenmund–von Braun reaction, a similar reaction for the synthesis of aromatic nitriles
- Hydrocyanation § With unsaturated carbonyl compounds, a similar reaction with enones
