= Pseudomonas veronii =

Scientific classification
- Domain: Bacteria
- Kingdom: Pseudomonadati
- Phylum: Pseudomonadota
- Class: Gammaproteobacteria
- Order: Pseudomonadales
- Family: Pseudomonadaceae
- Genus: Pseudomonas
- Species: P. veronii

Binomial name
- Pseudomonas veronii Elomari, et al. 1996

Type strain
- ATCC 700474 CCUG 43519; CIP 104663; CFML 92-134; DSM 11331; JCM 11942; LMG 17761

Subspecies
- P. v. subsp. inensis P. v. subsp. veronii

Species of bacterium

Pseudomonas veronii is a Gram-negative, rod-shaped, fluorescent, motile bacterium isolated from natural springs in France. It may be used for bioremediation of contaminated soils, as it has been shown to degrade a variety of simple aromatic organic compounds. Based on 16S rRNA analysis, P. veronii has been placed in the P. fluorescens group.

== See also ==
- Pseudomonas viridiflava
