= Rosenmund–von Braun reaction =

Chemical reaction

Rosenmund-von Braun reaction
Named after	Karl Wilhelm Rosenmund; Julius von Braun
Reaction type	Substitution reaction

Identifiers
Organic Chemistry Portal	rosenmund-von-braun-reaction
RSC ontology ID	RXNO:0000288

The Rosenmund–von Braun synthesis is an organic reaction in which an aryl halide reacts with cuprous cyanide to yield an aryl nitrile.

The reaction was named after Karl Wilhelm Rosenmund who together with his Ph.D. student Erich Struck discovered in 1914 that aryl halide reacts with ethanol-water solution of potassium cyanide and catalytic amounts of cuprous cyanide at 200 °C. The reaction yields the carboxylic acid, not the nitrile, but Rosenmund speculated that the intermediate should be the nitrile, since nitriles on aromatic rings can react to form carboxylic acids. Independently Alfred Pongratz and Julius von Braun improved the reaction by changing the reaction conditions to higher temperatures and used no solvent for the reaction. Further improvement of the reaction was done in the following years, for example the use of ionic liquids as solvent for the reaction.

Other example

== See also ==
- Kolbe nitrile synthesis
- Sandmeyer reaction
- Von Braun reaction
