= Nitrilium =

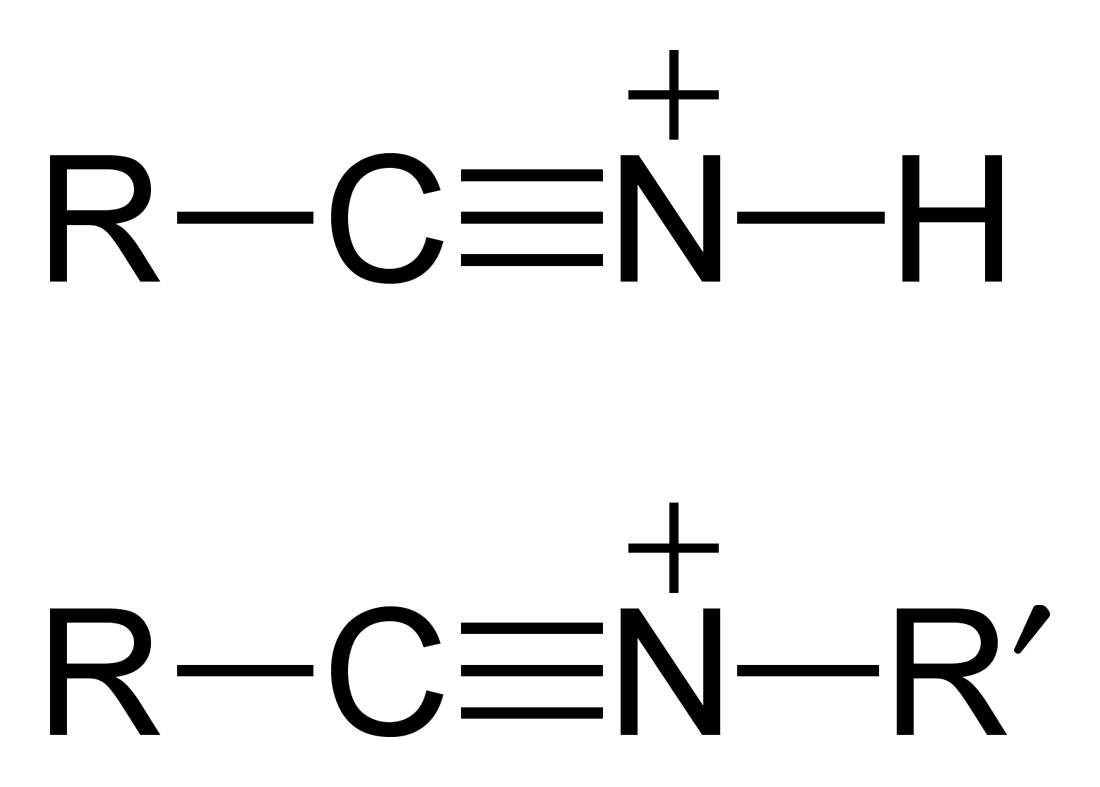
The general structures of nitrilium ions

A nitrilium ion is a nitrile that has been protonated, [RCNH]^{+}, or alkylated, [RCNR′]^{+}.

== Synthesis ==
Nitriles are only weakly basic and are poor nucleophiles, but they will attack very reactive electrophiles such as carbocations.

Nitrilium salts can be prepared by reacting nitriles with trialkyloxonium salts. The nitrilium ions thus formed can then be reduced to secondary amines with sodium borohydride in diglyme. This is a convenient route to secondary amines of the form RCH_{2}—NH—R′.

== As intermediates ==
Nitrilium ions are believed to be intermediates in the hydrolysis of nitriles, the Beckmann rearrangement, the Friedel-Crafts cyclization of amines to isoquinolines, the Schmidt reaction with ketones, and the Ugi, Ritter, Pinner and Passerini reactions.
