= Organophosphate poisoning =

Toxic effect of pesticides

- Other names: Organophosphate toxicity, organophosphate overdose, organophosphate intoxication
- Specialty: Emergency medicine
- Symptoms: Increased saliva, diarrhea, small pupils, muscle tremors, confusion
- Usual onset: Within 12 hours
- Causes: Organophosphates
- Diagnostic method: Based on symptoms and confirmed by butyrylcholinesterase
- Differential diagnosis: Carbamate poisoning
- Prevention: decreasing access
- Medication: Atropine, oximes, diazepam
- Frequency: Nearly 3 million per year
- Deaths: >200,000 per year

Organophosphate poisoning is poisoning due to organophosphates (OPs). Organophosphates are used as insecticides, medications, and nerve agents. Symptoms include increased saliva and tear production, diarrhea, vomiting, small pupils, sweating, muscle tremors, and confusion. While onset of symptoms is often within minutes to hours, some symptoms can take weeks to appear. Symptoms can last for days to weeks.

Organophosphate poisoning occurs most commonly as a suicide attempt in farming areas of the developing world and less commonly by accident. Exposure can be from drinking, breathing in the vapors, or skin exposure. The underlying mechanism involves the inhibition of acetylcholinesterase (AChE), leading to the buildup of acetylcholine (ACh) in the body. Diagnosis is typically based on the symptoms and can be confirmed by measuring butyrylcholinesterase activity in the blood. Carbamate poisoning can present similarly.

Prevention efforts include banning very toxic types of organophosphates. Among those who work with pesticides the use of protective clothing and showering before going home is also useful. In those who have organophosphate poisoning the primary treatments are atropine, oximes such as pralidoxime, and diazepam. General measures such as oxygen and intravenous fluids are also recommended. Attempts to decontaminate the stomach, with activated charcoal or other means, have not been shown to be useful. While there is a theoretical risk of health care workers taking care of a poisoned person becoming poisoned themselves, the degree of risk appears to be very small.

OPs are one of the most common causes of poisoning worldwide. There are nearly 3 million poisonings per year resulting in two hundred thousand deaths. Around 15% of people who are poisoned die as a result. Organophosphate poisoning has been reported at least since 1962. It is considered the primary cause of Gulf War syndrome.

== Signs and symptoms ==
The symptoms of organophosphate poisoning include muscle weakness, fatigue, muscle cramps, fasciculation, and paralysis. Other symptoms include hypertension, and hypoglycemia.

Overstimulation of nicotinic acetylcholine receptors in the central nervous system, due to accumulation of ACh, results in anxiety, headache, convulsions, ataxia, depression of respiration and circulation, tremor, general weakness, and potentially coma. When there is expression of muscarinic overstimulation due to excess acetylcholine at muscarinic acetylcholine receptors symptoms of visual disturbances, tightness in chest, wheezing due to bronchoconstriction, increased bronchial secretions, increased salivation, lacrimation, sweating, peristalsis, and urination can occur.

The effects of organophosphate poisoning on muscarinic receptors are recalled using the mnemonic SLUDGEM (salivation, lacrimation, urination, defecation, gastrointestinal motility, emesis, miosis) An additional mnemonic is MUDDLES: miosis, urination, diarrhea, diaphoresis, lacrimation, excitation, and salivation. These mnemonics do not take into account the critical CNS and nicotinic effects of organophosphates.

The onset and severity of symptoms, whether acute or chronic, depends upon the specific chemical, the route of exposure (skin, lungs, or GI tract), the dose, and the individuals ability to degrade the compound, which the PON1 enzyme level will affect.

=== Reproductive effects ===
Certain reproductive effects in fertility, growth, and development for males and females have been linked specifically to OP pesticide exposure. Most of the research on reproductive effects has been conducted on farmers working with pesticides and insecticides in rural areas. For those males exposed to OP pesticides, poor semen and sperm quality have been seen, including reduced seminal volume and percentage motility, as well as a decrease in sperm count per ejaculate. In females menstrual cycle disturbances, longer pregnancies, spontaneous abortions, stillbirths, and some developmental effects in offspring have been linked to OP pesticide exposure. Prenatal exposure has been linked to impaired fetal growth and development. The effects of OP exposure on infants and children are at this time currently being researched to come to a conclusive finding. Evidence of OP exposure in pregnant mothers are linked to several health effects in the fetus. Some of these effects include delayed mental development, Pervasive developmental disorder (PDD), morphological abnormalities in the cerebral surface.

=== Neurotoxic effects ===
Neurotoxic effects have also been linked to poisoning with OP pesticides causing four neurotoxic effects in humans: cholinergic syndrome, intermediate syndrome, organophosphate-induced delayed polyneuropathy (OPIDP), and chronic organophosphate-induced neuropsychiatric disorder (COPIND). These syndromes result after acute and chronic exposure to OP pesticides.

Cholinergic syndrome occurs in acute poisonings with OP pesticides and is directly related to levels of AChE activity. Symptoms include miosis, sweating, lacrimation, gastrointestinal symptoms, respiratory difficulties, shortness of breath, slowed heart rate, cyanosis, vomiting, diarrhea, trouble sleeping, as well as other symptoms. Along with these central effects can be seen and finally seizures, convulsions, coma, respiratory failure. If the person survives the first day of poisoning, personality changes can occur, in addition to aggressive behavior, psychotic episodes, memory and attention disturbances, and other delayed effects. When death occurs, it is most commonly due to respiratory failure due to paralysis of respiratory muscles and depression of central nervous system, which is responsible for respiration. For people affected by cholinergic syndrome, atropine sulfate combined with an oxime is used to combat the effects of the acute OP poisoning. Diazepam is sometimes also administered if convulsions or muscle fasciculations begin.

The intermediate syndrome (IMS) appears in the interval between the end of the cholinergic crisis and the onset of OPIDP. Symptoms associated with IMS manifest between 24 and 96 hours after exposure. The exact etiology, incidence, and risk factors associated with IMS are not well understood, but IMS is recognized as a disorder of neuromuscular junctions. IMS occurs when a person has a prolonged and severe inhibition of AChE. It has been linked to specific OP pesticides such as parathion, methylparathion, and dichlorvos. Patients generally present with increasing weakness in the facial, neck flexor, and respiratory muscles.

OPIDP occurs in a small percentage of cases, roughly two weeks after exposure, where temporary paralysis occurs. This loss of function and ataxia of peripheral nerves and spinal cord is the phenomenon of OPIDP. Once the symptoms begin with shooting pains in both legs, the symptoms continue to worsen for 3–6 months. In the most severe cases quadriplegia has been observed. Treatment only affects sensory nerves, not motor neurons which may permanently lose function. The aging and phosphorylation of more than 70% of functional NTE in peripheral nerves is one of the processes involved in OPIDP. Standard treatments for OP poisoning are ineffective for OPIDP.

COPIND occurs without cholinergic symptoms and is independent of AChE inhibition. COPIND appears with a delay and is long lasting. Symptoms associated with COPIND include cognitive deficit, mood changes, autonomic dysfunction, peripheral neuropathy, and extrapyramidal symptoms. The underlying mechanisms of COPIND have not been determined, but it is hypothesized that withdrawal of OP pesticides after chronic exposure or acute exposure could be a factor.

=== Pregnancy ===
Evidence of exposure to OP pesticides during gestation and early postnatal period have been linked to neurodevelopmental effects in animals, specifically rats. Animals exposed in utero to chlorpyrifos exhibited decreased balance, poorer cliff avoidance, decreased locomotion, delays in maze performance, and increased gait abnormalities. Early gestation is believed to be a critical time period for the neurodevelopmental effects of pesticides. OPs affect the cholinergic system of fetuses, so exposure to chlorpyrifos during critical periods of brain development potentially could cause cellular, synaptic, and neurobehavioral abnormalities in animals. In rats exposed to methylparathion, studies found reduced AChE activity in all brain regions and subtle alterations in behaviors such as locomotor activity and impaired cage emergence. Organophosphates as whole have been linked to decreases in the length of limbs, head circumference, and slower rates of postnatal weight gain in mice.

=== Cancer ===
The International Agency for Research on Cancer (IARC) found that organophosphate exposure may increase cancer risk. Tetrachlorvinphos and parathion were classified as "possibly carcinogenic", malathion, and diazinon.

== Cause ==
OP poisoning typically occurs after exposure to OP pesticides by inhalation, ingestion and dermal contact. OP pesticides have been considered relatively safe, given their tendency to degrade quickly when exposed to air and light; however, residues may remain on fruits and vegetables. Certain OP pesticides have been banned for use on some crops, For example, methyl parathion is banned from use on some crops and permitted on others. It can also occur through deliberate poisoning using nerve agents such as sarin and tabun.

=== Examples ===
- Insecticides including malathion, parathion, diazinon, fenthion, dichlorvos, chlorpyrifos, ethion, trichlorfon
- Nerve agents including soman, sarin, tabun, VX
- Herbicides including tribufos [DEF], merphos are tricresyl phosphate–containing industrial chemicals.

The U.S. Environmental Protection Agency maintains an extensive list of commercially-sold organophosphate products for anyone worried about possible exposure. It can be found here (in the blue sidebars of the document).

Exposure to any of the above-listed organophosphates may occur through inhalation, skin absorption, and ingestion, most commonly of food that has been treated with an OP herbicide or insecticide. Exposure to these chemicals can occur at public buildings, schools, residential areas, and in agricultural areas. Chlorpyrifos and Malathion have been linked to reproductive effects, neurotoxicity, kidney/liver damage, and birth defects. Dichlorvos has also been linked to reproductive effects, neurotoxicity, and kidney/liver damage. It is also recognized to be a possible carcinogen.

== Pathophysiology ==
The health effects associated with organophosphate poisoning are a result of excess acetylcholine (ACh) present at different nerve synapses and neuromuscular junctions across the body. Specifically, acetylcholinesterase (AChE), the enzyme that normally and constantly breaks down acetylcholine, is inhibited by the organophosphate substance. ACh accumulates in the parasympathetic nervous system, the central nervous system, and in nicotinic neuromuscular junctions.

Organophosphate inhibition of AChE may be reversible or irreversible, depending on whether covalent bonding (also called "aging" in this context) occurs. Chemically, organophosphates cause poisoning by phosphorylating the serine hydroxyl residue on AChE, which inactivates AChE. This causes disturbances across the cholinergic synapses and can only be reactivated very slowly, if at all. Paraoxonase 1 (PON1) is a key enzyme involved in organophosphate toxicity and has been found to be critical in determining an organism's sensitivity to organophosphate exposure.

=== Sensitivity ===
PON1 can inactivate some OPs through hydrolysis. PON1 hydrolyzes the active metabolites in several OP insecticides such as chlorpyrifos oxon, and diazoxon, as well as nerve agents such as soman, sarin, and VX. PON1 hydrolyzes the metabolites, not the parent compounds of insectides. PON1 gene polymorphism can lead to a variety of different enzyme levels and catalytic efficiency of this esterase, which in turn suggests that different individuals may be more or less susceptible to the toxic effect of OP exposure. Higher levels of PON1 plasma hydrolytic activity provide a greater degree of protection against OP pesticides. Rats injected with purified PON1 from rabbit serum were more resistant to acute cholinergic activity than the control rats. PON1 knockouts in mice are found to be more sensitive to the toxicity of pesticides, like chlorpyrifos. Animal experiments indicate that while PON1 plays a significant role in regulating the toxicity of OPs its degree of protection given depends on the compound (i.e. Chlorpyrifos oxon or diazoxon). The catalytic efficiency with which PON1 can degrade toxic OPs determines the degree of protection that PON1 can provide for organism. The higher the concentration of PON1 the better the protection provided. PON1 activity is much lower in neonates, so neonates are more sensitive to OP exposure. In 2006, up to a 13-fold degree of variation was seen in PON1 levels in adults; connected findings showed that biological sensitivity to diazoxon showed similar or even greater variance.

== Diagnosis ==
A number of measurements exist to assess exposure and early biological effects for organophosphate poisoning. Measurements of OP metabolites in both the blood and urine can be used to determine if a person has been exposed to organophosphates. Specifically in the blood, metabolites of cholinesterases, such as butyrylcholinesterase (BuChE) activity in plasma, neuropathy target esterase (NTE) in lymphocytes, and of acetylcholinesterase (AChE) activity in red blood cells. Due to both AChE and BuChE being the main targets of organophosphates, their measurement is widely used as an indication of an exposure to an OP. The main restriction on this type of diagnosis is that depending on the OP, the degree to which either AChE or BuChE are inhibited differs; therefore, measure of metabolites in blood and urine do not specify which OP agent is responsible for the poisoning. However, for fast initial screening, determining AChE and BuChE activity in the blood are the most widely used procedures for confirming a diagnosis of OP poisoning. The most widely used portable testing device is the Test-mate ChE field test, which can be used to determine levels of Red Blood Cells (RBC), AChE and plasma (pseudo) cholinesterase (PChE) in the blood in about four minutes. This test has been shown to be just as effective as a regular laboratory test and because of this, the portable ChE field test is frequently used by people who work with pesticides on a daily basis.

== Treatment ==
Current antidotes for OP poisoning consist of a (preventive) pretreatment with carbamates to protect AChE from inhibition by OP compounds and post-exposure treatments with anti-cholinergic drugs.

Anti-cholinergic drugs work to counteract the effects of excess acetylcholine and reactivate AChE. Atropine is the main antidote; it is a muscarinic antagonist, and thus blocks the action of acetylcholine peripherally. An pyridinium oxime-type cholinesterase reactivator such as pralidoxime, trimedoxime, or obidoxime is sometimes used in conjunction with atropine, though the use of them has been found to be of no benefit, or to be possibly harmful, in at least two meta-analyses. While the efficacy of atropine has been well-established, clinical experience with pralidoxime has led to widespread doubt about its efficacy in treatment of OP poisoning.

These antidotes are effective at preventing lethality from OP poisoning, but current treatments lack the ability to prevent post-exposure incapacitation, performance deficits, or permanent brain damage.

=== Potential treatments ===
A cholinesterase such as human serum BChE (HuBChE) can be used as a pretreatment (prophylactic). By being present in high levels in blood, they can sequester highly toxic OPs before they can reach their physiological targets and prevent the toxic effects from occurring. HuBChe can offer a broad range of protection for nerve agents including soman, sarin, tabun, and VX. HuBChE also possess a very long retention time in the human circulation system and because it is from a human source it will not produce any antagonistic immunological responses. HuBChE is currently being assessed for inclusion into the protective regimen against OP nerve agent poisoning. HuBChE can be made using recombinant protein technology: that is, by inserting the gene for it into other organisms.

The human enzyme PON1 is able to break down organophosphates. There is some interest in developing it (ideally, a more active mutant) as a pre-treatment.

Another potential treatment being researched is the Class III anti-arrhythmic agents. Hyperkalemia of the tissue is one of the symptoms associated with OP poisoning. While the cellular processes leading to cardiac toxicity are not well understood, the potassium current channels are believed to be involved. Class III anti-arrhythmic agents block the potassium membrane currents in cardiac cells, which makes them a candidate for become a therapeutic of OP poisoning.

There is insufficient evidence to support using plasma alkalinisation to treat a person with organophosphate poisoning.

== Epidemiology ==
Organophosphate pesticides are one of the top causes of poisoning worldwide, with an annual incidence of poisonings among agricultural workers varying from 3-10% per country.

== History ==
=== Ginger Jake ===
A striking example of OPIDN occurred during the 1930s Prohibition Era when thousands of men in the American South and Midwest developed arm and leg weakness and pain after drinking a "medicinal" alcohol substitute. The drink, called "Ginger Jake", contained an adulterated Jamaican ginger extract containing tri-ortho-cresyl phosphate (TOCP) which resulted in partially reversible neurological damage. The damage resulted in the limping "Jake Leg" or "Jake Walk" which were terms frequently used in the blues music of the period. Europe and Morocco both experienced outbreaks of TOCP poisoning from contaminated abortifacients and cooking oil, respectively.

=== Gulf War syndrome ===
Research has linked the neurological abnormalities found in Persian Gulf War veterans who have chronic multisymptom illnesses to exposure to wartime combinations of organophosphate chemical nerve agents. Before, it was believed that veterans had a psychologically based disorder or depression, most likely post-traumatic stress disorder (PTSD). Many veterans were given pyridostigmine bromide (PB) pills to protect against nerve gas agents such as sarin and soman. During the war veterans were exposed to combinations of organophosphate pesticides and nerve agents, which produced symptoms associated with chronic organophosphate-induced delayed polyneuropathy (OPIDP) syndrome. Similar symptoms found in the veterans were the same symptoms reported for individuals in occupational settings who were acutely poisoned by organophosphates, such as chlorpyrifos. Studies found veterans experienced deficits in intellectual and academic abilities, simple motor skills, memory impairment, and impaired emotional function. These symptoms indicate brain damage, not a psychologically based disorder.

== Society and culture ==
=== United States ===
Under a 1988 amendment to the Federal Insecticide, Fungicide and Rodenticide Act (FIFRA), the U.S. Environmental Protection Agency (EPA) regulates organophosphate pesticides Its focus was initially on registering pesticides for use on food crops. No pesticide can be sold in the United States before the EPA has reviewed the manufacturer's application for registration and determined that the use of the product will not present an unreasonable risk to the public or the environment. In 1996, with the passage of the Food Quality Protection Act, Congress required the EPA to reassess all existing pesticide tolerances with specific consideration for children. This resulted in a 10-year review process of the health and environmental effects of all pesticides, beginning with the organophosphates. As part of that process, in 1999 the EPA announced a ban the use of organophosphate pesticide methyl parathion and significant restrictions on the use of another OP, azinphos methyl, in what they called "kid's food". The review process was concluded in 2006 and eliminated or modified thousands of other uses of pesticides. Other legislative action has been taken to protect children from the risks of organophosphates.

Many non-governmental and research groups, as well as the EPA's Office of Inspector General, have expressed concerns that the review did not take into account possible neurotoxic effects on developing fetuses and children, an area of developing research. OIG report. A group of leading EPA scientists sent a letter to the chief administrator, Stephen Johnson, decrying the lack of developmental neurotoxicity data in the review process. EPA Letter EHP article New studies have shown toxicity to developing organisms during certain "critical periods" at doses much lower than those previously suspected to cause harm.

Even the restrictions which did successfully pass have been controversial. For example, in 1999 the EPA restricted the use of chlorpyrifos in households (under the commercial name Dursban). However, the EPA did not limit its use in agriculture. Chlorpyrifos remains one of the most widely used pesticides. This may soon change. On February 8, 2013, the EPA requested comment on a preliminary evaluation of the potential risks to children and other bystanders from volatilization of chlorpyrifos from treated crops

=== Vulnerable groups ===
Some populations are more vulnerable to pesticide poisoning. In the United States, farmworkers can be exposed via direct spray, drift, spills, direct contact with treated crops or soil, or defective or missing protective equipment. Migrant workers may be at an especially high risk of chronic exposure as over the course of a growing season, they may work at multiple farms, thus increasing their exposure to pesticides. Farmworkers in more permanent positions may receive more safety training and/or more "consistent reinforcement of safety behaviors than seasonal farmworkers or day laborers." For migrant farmworkers, language barriers and/or education level could be a barrier to understanding posted warning signs, labels and safety warnings located on the pesticides, or understanding any safety training that is provided.

Other factors that may lead to greater exposure for the migrant farmworker population include: limited or no access to safety equipment, little to no control over pesticide use, cultural factors, and fear of job loss if they report potential hazards. Studies have also shown that there are some key beliefs by farmworkers that may exacerbate pesticide exposure, including the belief that "pesticides must be felt, seen, tasted, or smelled to be present; the skin blocks absorption and body openings facilitate it; exposure occurs only when a pesticide is wet;…and acute, not low-level chronic exposure is the primary danger."

This, coupled with the difficulty or uncertainty of recognizing and/or diagnosing chronic pesticide poisoning by the medical community, makes it difficult for exposed workers to receive an effective remedy. Migrant workers may also be hesitant to seek-out medical care due to lack of health insurance, language barriers, immigration status, cost, cultural factors, lack of transportation, fear of job loss, and lack of awareness of workers' compensation benefits.

=== Sergei and Yulia Skripal ===
In March 2018, Sergei Skripal and his daughter were poisoned in Salisbury, England, with an organophosphate poison known as a Novichok agent. Both fell unconscious while sitting on a park bench. A first responder to the scene also became contaminated and had symptoms of organophosphate poisoning. All three survived after hospital treatment. Despite continually denying responsibility for the attack, Russia is suspected to be behind the poisonings.

=== Alexei Navalny ===
On 20 August 2020, Russian politician Alexei Navalny developed life-threatening acute poisoning symptoms on a flight. He was later transferred to Berlin, where poisoning by a cholinesterase inhibitor was diagnosed and confirmed by multiple tests in independent laboratories.
