= Chlorpyrifos =

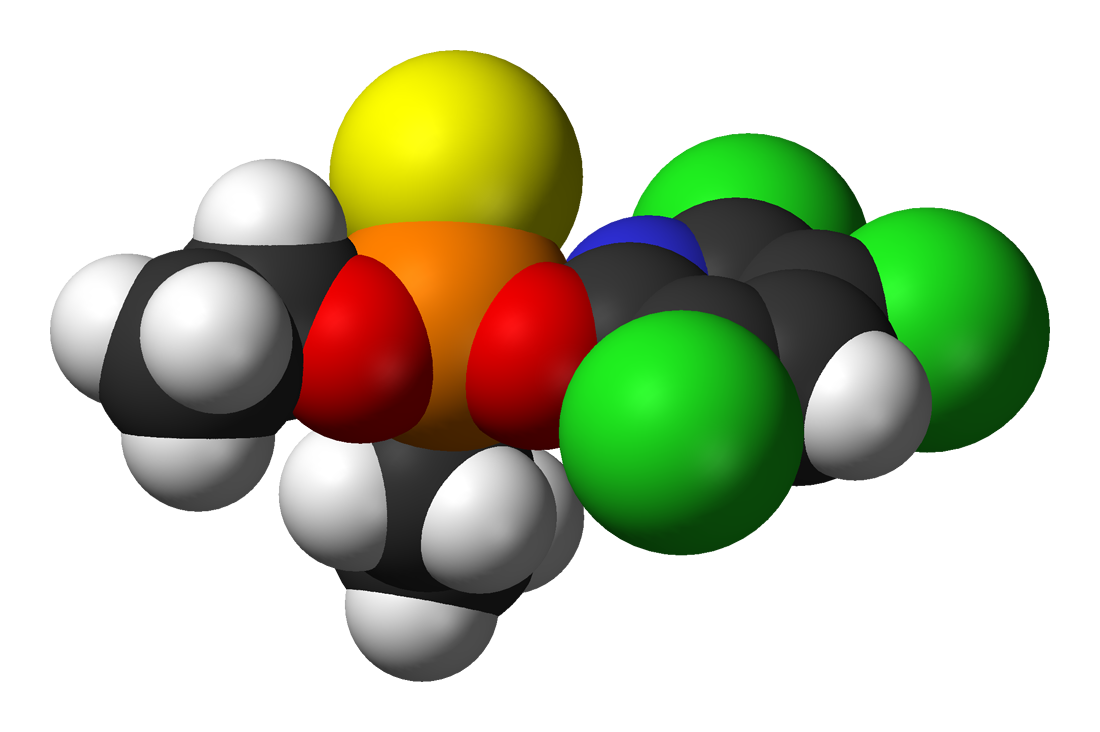

Names
- Preferred IUPAC name O,O-Diethyl O-(3,5,6-trichloropyridin-2-yl) phosphorothioate
- Other names Brodan, Bolton insecticide, Chlorpyrifos-ethyl, Cobalt, Detmol UA, Dowco 179, Dursban, Empire, Eradex, Hatchet, Lorsban, Nufos, Paqeant, Piridane, Scout, Stipend, Tricel, Warhawk, others

Identifiers
CAS Number	2921-88-2
3D model (JSmol)	Interactive image
ChEBI	CHEBI:34631
ChEMBL	ChEMBL463210
ChemSpider	2629
ECHA InfoCard	100.018.969
KEGG	D07688
PubChem CID	2730
UNII	JCS58I644W
CompTox Dashboard (EPA)	DTXSID4020458
- InChI: InChI=1S/C9H11Cl3NO3PS/c1-3-14-17(18,15-4-2)16-9-7(11)5-6(10)8(12)13-9/h5H,3-4H2,1-2H3 Key: SBPBAQFWLVIOKP-UHFFFAOYSA-N; InChI=1/C9H11Cl3NO3PS/c1-3-14-17(18,15-4-2)16-9-7(11)5-6(10)8(12)13-9/h5H,3-4H2,1-2H3 Key: SBPBAQFWLVIOKP-UHFFFAOYAG
- SMILES: Clc1c(OP(=S)(OCC)OCC)nc(Cl)c(Cl)c1

Properties
Chemical formula	C_{9}H_{11}Cl_{3}NO_{3}PS
Molar mass	350.57 g·mol^{−1}
Appearance	Colorless crystals
Odor	Mercaptan-like
Density	1.398 g/cm^{3} (43.5 °C)
Melting point	43 °C (109 °F; 316 K)
Boiling point	160 °C; 320 °F; 433 K (decomposes)
Solubility in water	2 mg/L
log P	4.96 (octanol/water)

Hazards
- Occupational safety and health (OHS/OSH)
Main hazards	acute toxic, environmental hazard, combustible, reacts strongly with amines, strong acids, caustics
- Lethal dose or concentration (LD, LC)
LD_{50} (median dose)	135 mg/kg (rat, oral); 202 mg/kg (rat, dermal)
- NIOSH (US health exposure limits)
PEL (Permissible)	none
REL (Recommended)	TWA 0.2 mg/m^{3} ST 0.6 mg/m^{3} [skin]
IDLH (Immediate danger)	N.D.
- Except where otherwise noted, data are given for materials in their standard state (at 25 °C [77 °F], 100 kPa). verify (what is ?) Infobox references

Chlorpyrifos (CPS), also known as chlorpyrifos ethyl, is an organophosphate pesticide that has been used on crops, animals, in buildings, and in other settings, to kill several pests, including insects and worms. It acts on the nervous systems of insects by inhibiting the acetylcholinesterase enzyme. Chlorpyrifos was patented in 1966 by Dow Chemical Company.

Chlorpyrifos is considered moderately hazardous to humans (Class II) by the World Health Organization based on acute toxicity information dating to 1999. Exposure surpassing recommended levels has been linked to neurological effects, persistent developmental disorders, and autoimmune disorders. Exposure during pregnancy may harm the mental development of children.

In the United Kingdom, the use of chlorpyrifos was banned as of 1 April 2016 (with one minor exception). As of 2020, chlorpyrifos and chlorpyrifos-methyl were banned throughout the European Union, where they may no longer be used. In May 2025, the EU listed chlorpyrifos as a persistent organic pollutant (POP) under the Stockholm Convention on Persistent Organic Pollutants.

As of August 18, 2021, the U.S. Environmental Protection Agency (EPA) announced a ban on the use of chlorpyrifos on food crops in the United States. Most home uses of chlorpyrifos had already been banned in the U.S. and Canada since 2001. It is banned in several other countries and jurisdictions as well. The chlorpyrifos ban on food crops is the result of a 1999 lawsuit filed by Natural Resources Defense Council (NRDC) to force the EPA to take action on the riskiest pesticides, as well as five additional successful court orders obtained by Earthjustice to force the EPA to take action on a 2007 petition to ban chlorpyrifos filed by NRDC and the Pesticide Action Network of North America (PANNA).

== Uses ==
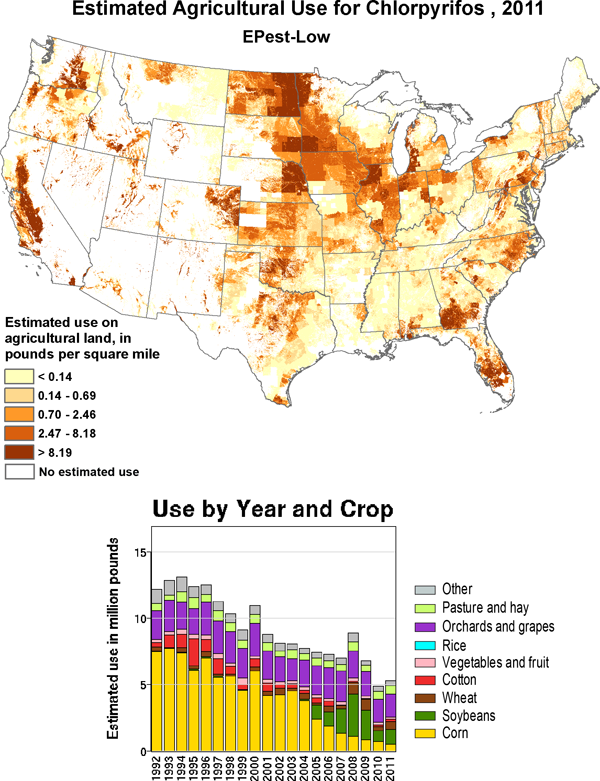
Use in the US

Chlorpyrifos was used in about 100 countries around the world to control insects in agricultural, residential, and commercial settings. Its use in residential applications is restricted in multiple countries. According to Dow, in 2014 chlorpyrifos was registered for use in nearly 100 countries and is annually applied to approximately 8.5 million crop acres. The crops for which it was most useful include cotton, corn, almonds, and fruit trees, including oranges, bananas, and apples.

Chlorpyrifos was first registered for use in the United States in 1965 for the control of foliage and soil-born insects. The chemical became widely used in residential settings, on golf course turf, as a structural termite control agent, and in agriculture. Most residential use of chlorpyrifos has been phased out in the United States after many uses were banned. Agricultural use remains common though it is being banned in California and the EU. The US EPA banned the use of chlorpyrifos on food crops in 2021, though courts overturned this decision in 2023.

EPA estimated that, between 1987 and 1998, about 21 million pounds of chlorpyrifos were used annually in the US. In 2001, chlorpyrifos ranked 15th among pesticides used in the United States, with an estimated 8 to 11 million pounds applied. In 2007, it ranked 14th among pesticide ingredients used in agriculture in the United States.

=== Application ===
Chlorpyrifos is normally supplied as a 23.5% or 50% liquid (emulsifiable concentrate). The recommended concentration for direct-spray pin point application is 0.5% and for wide area application a 0.03–0.12% mix is recommended (US). In Australia, large scale applications are between 35-130 g/Ha of active ingredient.

=== Kinetics ===
Chlorpyrifos enters insects through several routes. Simon et al. 1998 report that insects are exposed to chlorpyrifos through ingesting treated food plants. They also found it to enter through skin and membranes of the respiratory system.

=== Mechanism of action ===
Like other organophosphate pesticides chlorpyrifos acts by acetylcholinesterase inhibition.

== Human toxicity ==
Chlorpyrifos exposure may lead to acute toxicity at higher doses. Persistent health effects follow acute poisoning or from long-term exposure to low doses, and developmental effects appear in fetuses and children even at very small doses.

=== Acute health effects ===
For acute effects, the World Health Organization classifies chlorpyrifos as Class II: moderately hazardous. The oral LD50 in experimental animals is 32 to 1000 mg/kg. The dermal LD50 in rats is greater than 2000 mg/kg and 1000 to 2000 mg/kg in rabbits. The 4-hour inhalation of LC50 for chlorpyrifos in rats is greater than 200 mg/m^{3}.

==== Symptoms of acute exposure ====
Acute poisoning results mainly from interference with the acetylcholine neurotransmission pathway, leading to a range of neuromuscular symptoms. Relatively mild poisoning can result in eye-watering, increased saliva and sweating, nausea, and headache. Intermediate exposure may lead to muscle spasms or weakness, vomiting, or diarrhea, and impaired vision. Symptoms of severe poisoning include seizures, unconsciousness, paralysis, and suffocation from lung failure.

Children are more likely to experience muscle weakness rather than twitching; excessive saliva rather than sweat or tears; seizures; and sleepiness or coma.

==== Frequency of acute exposure ====
Acute poisoning is probably most common in agricultural areas in Asia, where many small farmers are affected. Poisoning may be due to occupational or accidental exposure or intentional self-harm. Precise numbers of chlorpyrifos poisonings globally are not available. Pesticides are used in an estimated 200,000+ suicides annually with tens of thousands due to chlorpyrifos. Organophosphates are thought to constitute two-thirds of ingested pesticides in rural Asia. Chlorpyrifos is among the commonly used pesticides used for self-harm.

In the US, the number of incidents of chlorpyrifos exposure reported to the US National Pesticide Information Center shrank sharply from over 200 in the year 2000 to less than 50 in 2003, following the residential ban.

==== Treatment ====
Poisoning is treated with atropine and simultaneously with oximes such as pralidoxime. Atropine blocks acetylcholine from binding with muscarinic receptors, which reduces the pesticide's impact. However, atropine does not affect acetylcholine at nicotinic receptors and thus is a partial treatment. Pralidoxime is intended to reactivate acetylcholinesterase, but the benefit of oxime treatment is questioned. A randomized controlled trial (RCT) supported the use of higher doses of pralidoxime rather than lower doses. A subsequent double-blind RCT, that treated patients who self-poisoned, found no benefit of pralidoxime, including specifically in chlorpyrifos patients.

=== Tourist deaths ===
Chlorpyrifos poisoning was described by New Zealand scientists as the likely cause of death of several tourists in Chiang Mai, Thailand who developed myocarditis in 2011. Thai investigators came to no conclusion on the subject, but maintain that chlorpyrifos was not responsible and that the deaths were not linked.

=== Long term ===
==== Development ====
Epidemiological and experimental animal studies suggest that infants and children are more susceptible than adults to the effects of low-dose exposure. Chlorpyrifos has been suggested to have negative impacts on cognitive functions in the developing brain. The young have a decreased capacity to detoxify chlorpyrifos and its metabolites. It is suggested that adolescents differ from adults in the metabolism of these compounds due to the maturation of organs in adolescents. This results in disruption in nervous system developmental processes, as observed in animal experiments. There are several studies observed in animals that show that chlorpyrifos alters the expression of essential genes that assist in the development of the brain.

Human studies: In multiple epidemiological studies, chlorpyrifos exposure during gestation or childhood has been linked with lower birth weight and neurological changes such as slower motor development and attention problems. Children with prenatal exposure to chlorpyrifos have been shown to have lower IQs. They have also been shown to have a higher chance of developing autism, attention deficit problems, and developmental disorders. A cohort of 7-year-old children was studied for neurological damage from prenatal exposure to chlorpyrifos. The study determined that the exposed children had deficits in working memory and full scale intelligence quotient (IQ). In a study on groups of Chinese infants, those exposed to chlorpyrifos showed significant decreases in motor functions such as reflexes, locomotion, and grasping at 9 months compared to those not exposed. Exposure to organophosphate pesticides in general has been increasingly associated with changes in children's cognitive, behavioral and motor performance. Infant girls were shown to be more susceptible to harmful effects from organophosphate insecticides than infant boys.

Animal experiments: In experiments with rats, early, short-term low-dose exposure to chlorpyrifos resulted in lasting neurological changes, with larger effects on emotional processing and cognition than on motor skills. Such rats exhibited behaviors consistent with depression and reduced anxiety. In rats, low-level exposure during development has its greatest neurotoxic effects during the period in which sex differences in the brain develop. Exposure leads to reductions or reversals of normal gender differences. Exposure to low levels of chlorpyrifos early in rat life or as adults also affects metabolism and body weight. These rats show increased body weight as well as changes in liver function and chemical indicators similar to prediabetes, likely associated with changes to the cyclic AMP system. Moreover, experiments with zebrafish showed significant detriments to survivability, reproductive processes, and motor function. Varying doses created a 30%–100% mortality rate of embryos after 90 days. Embryos were shown to have decreased mitosis, resulting in mortality or developmental dysfunctions. In the experiments where embryos did survive, spinal lordosis and lower motor functions were observed. The same study showed that chlorpyrifos had more severe morphological deformities and mortality in embryos than diazinon, another commonly used organophosphate insecticide.

==== Adulthood ====
Adults may develop lingering health effects following acute exposure or repeated low-dose exposure. Among agricultural workers, chlorpyrifos has been associated with slightly increased risk of wheeze, a whistling sound while breathing due to obstruction of the airways.

Among 50 farm pesticides studied, chlorpyrifos was associated with higher risks of lung cancer among frequent pesticide applicators than among infrequent or non-users. Pesticide applicators as a whole were found to have a 50% lower cancer risk than the general public, likely due to their nearly 50% lower smoking rate. However, chlorpyrifos applicators had a 15% lower cancer risk than the general public, which the study suggests indicates a link between chlorpyrifos application and lung cancer.

Twelve people who had been exposed to chlorpyrifos were studied over periods of 1 to 4.5 years. They were found to have a heightened immune responses to common allergens and increased antibiotic sensitivities, elevated CD26 cells, and a higher rate of autoimmunity, compared with control groups. Autoantibodies were directed toward smooth muscle, parietal cell, brush border, thyroid gland, myelin, and the subjects also had more anti-nuclear antibodies.

== Chlorpyrifos methyl ==
The Dow Chemical Company also developed chlorpyrifos methyl in 1966, which had a lower acute toxicity (WHO class III), but this appears to be no longer in commercial use. The molecule is similar to chlorpyrifos ethyl, but with a O,O dimethyl chain. Proposed applications included vector control.

Australia uses chlorpyrifos-methyl, alongside normal chlorpyrifos. Chlorpyrifos-methyl is registered and sold as "Biochlor 500", "Diplomat 500" and "D-PLOY PLUS". "Reldan" used to be sold by Dow AgroSciences, though its last registration expired in 2022.

== Mechanisms of toxicity ==
=== Acetylcholine neurotransmission ===
Structure of chlorpyrifos-oxon

Primarily, chlorpyrifos and other organophosphate pesticides interfere with signaling from the neurotransmitter acetylcholine. One chlorpyrifos metabolite, chlorpyrifos-oxon, binds permanently to the enzyme acetylcholinesterase, preventing this enzyme from deactivating acetylcholine in the synapse. By irreversibly inhibiting acetylcholinesterase, chlorpyrifos leads to a build-up of acetylcholine between neurons and a stronger, longer-lasting signal to the next neuron. Only when new molecules of acetylcholinesterase have been synthesized can normal function return. Acute symptoms of chlorpyrifos poisoning only occur when more than 70% of acetylcholinesterase molecules are inhibited. This mechanism is well established for acute chlorpyrifos poisoning and also some lower-dose health impacts. It is also the primary insecticidal mechanism.

=== Non-cholinesterase mechanisms ===
Chlorpyrifos may affect other neurotransmitters, enzymes and cell signaling pathways, potentially at doses below those that substantially inhibit acetylcholinesterase. The extent of and mechanisms for these effects remain to be fully characterized. Laboratory experiments in rats and cell cultures suggest that exposure to low doses of chlorpyrifos may alter serotonin signaling and increase rat symptoms of depression; change the expression or activity of several serine hydrolase enzymes, including neuropathy target esterase and several endocannabinoid enzymes; affect components of the cyclic AMP system; and influence other chemical pathways.

=== Paraoxonase activity ===
The enzyme paraoxonase 1 (PON1) detoxifies chlorpyrifos oxon, the more toxic metabolite of chlorpyrifos, via hydrolysis. In laboratory animals, additional PON1 protects against chlorpyrifos toxicity while individuals that do not produce PON1 are particularly susceptible. In humans, studies about the effect of PON1 activity on the toxicity of chlorpyrifos and other organophosphates are mixed, with modest yet inconclusive evidence that higher levels of PON1 activity may protect against chlorpyrifos exposure in adults; PON1 activity may be most likely to offer protection from low-level chronic doses. Human populations have genetic variation in the sequence of PON1 and its promoter region that may influence the effectiveness of PON1 at detoxifying chlorpyrifos oxon and the amount of PON1 available to do so. Some evidence indicates that children born to women with low PON1 may be particularly susceptible to chlorpyrifos exposure. Further, infants produce low levels of PON1 until six months to several years after birth, likely increasing the risk from chlorpyrifos exposure early in life.

=== Combined exposures ===
Several studies have examined the effects of combined exposure to chlorpyrifos and other chemical agents, and these combined exposures can result in different effects during development. Female rats exposed first to dexamethasone, a treatment for premature labor, for three days in utero and then to low levels of chlorpyrifos for four days after birth experienced additional damage to the acetylcholine system upstream of the synapse that was not observed with either exposure alone. In both male and female rats, combined exposures to dexamethasone and chlorpyrifos decreased serotonin turnover in the synapse, for female rats with a greater-than-additive result. Rats that were co-exposed to dexamethasone and chlorpyrifos also exhibited complex behavioral differences from exposure to either chemical alone, including lessening or reversing normal sex differences in behavior. In the lab, in rats and neural cells co-exposed to both nicotine and chlorpyrifos, nicotine appears to protect against chlorpyrifos acetylcholinesterase inhibition and reduce its effects on neurodevelopment. In at least one study, nicotine appeared to enhance chlorpyrifos detoxification.

== Human exposure ==
In 2011, EPA estimated that, in the general US population, people consume 0.009 micrograms of chlorpyrifos per kilogram of their body weight per day directly from food residue. Children are estimated to consume a greater quantity of chlorpyrifos per unit of body weight from food residue, with toddlers the highest at 0.025 micrograms of chlorpyrifos per kilogram of their body weight per day. People may also ingest chlorpyrifos from drinking water or from residue in food handling establishments. The EPA's acceptable daily dose is 0.3 micrograms/kg/day. However, as of 2016, EPA scientists had not been able to find any level of exposure to the pesticide that was safe. The EPA 2016 report states in part "... this assessment indicates that dietary risks from food alone are of concern ..." The report also states that previous published risk assessments for "chlorpyrifos may not provide a sufficiently health protective human health risk assessment given the potential for neurodevelopmental outcomes."

Humans can be exposed to chlorpyrifos by way of ingestion (e.g., residue on treated produce, drinking water), inhalation (especially of indoor air), or absorption (i.e., through the skin). However, compared to other organophosphates, chlorpyrifos degrades relatively quickly once released into the environment. According to the National Institutes of Health, the half-life for chlorpyrifos (i.e., the period of time that it takes for the active amount of the chemical to decrease by 50%) "can typically range from 33–56 days for soil incorporated applications and 7–15 days for surface applications"; in water, the half-life is about 25 days, and in the air, the half-life can range from four to ten days.

Children of agricultural workers are more likely to come into contact with chlorpyrifos. A study done in an agricultural community in Washington State showed that children who lived in closer proximity to farmlands had higher levels of chlorpyrifos residues from house dust. Chlorpyrifos residues were also found on work boots and children's hands, showing that agricultural families could take home these residues from their jobs. Urban and suburban children get most of their chlorpyrifos exposure from fruits and vegetables. A study done in North Carolina on children's exposure showed that chlorpyrifos was detected in 50% of the food, dust, and air samples in both their homes and daycare, with the main route of exposure being through ingestion. Certain other populations with higher likely exposure to chlorpyrifos, such as people who apply pesticides, work on farms, or live in agricultural communities, have been measured in the US to excrete TCPy in their urine at levels that are 5 to 10 times greater than levels in the general population.

As of 2016, chlorpyrifos was the most used conventional insecticide in the US and was used in over 40 states; the top five states (in total pounds applied) are California, North Dakota, Minnesota, Iowa, and Texas. It was used on over 50 crops, with the top five crops (in total pounds applied) being soybeans, corn, alfalfa, oranges, and almonds. Additionally, crops with 30% or more of the crop treated (compared to total acres grown) include apples, asparagus, walnuts, table grapes, cherries, cauliflower, broccoli, and onions.

Air monitoring studies conducted by the California Air Resources Board (CARB) documented chlorpyrifos in the air of California communities. Analyses indicate that children living in areas of high chlorpyrifos use are often exposed to levels that exceed EPA dosages. A study done in Washington state using passive air samplers showed that households who lived less than 250 meters from a fruit tree field had higher levels of chlorpyrifos concentrations in the air than households that were further away. Advocacy groups monitored air samples in Washington and Lindsay, California, in 2006 with comparable results. Grower and pesticide industry groups argued that the air levels documented in these studies are not high enough to cause significant exposure or adverse effects. A follow-up biomonitoring study in Lindsay also showed that people there display above-normal chlorpyrifos levels.

== Effects on wildlife ==
=== Aquatic life ===
Among freshwater aquatic organisms, crustaceans and insects appear to be more sensitive to acute exposure than fish. Aquatic insects and animals appear to absorb chlorpyrifos directly from water rather than ingesting it with their diet or through sediment exposure.

Concentrated chlorpyrifos released into rivers killed insects, shrimp and fish. In Britain, the rivers Roding (1985), Ouse (2001), Wey (2002 & 2003), and Kennet (2013) all experienced insect, shrimp, or fish kills as a result of small releases of concentrated chlorpyrifos. The July 2013 release along the River Kennet poisoned insect life and shrimp along 15 km of the river, likely from a half a cup of concentrated chlorpyrifos washed down a drain.

=== Bees ===
Acute exposure to chlorpyrifos can be toxic to bees, with an oral LD50 of 360 ng/bee and a contact LD50 of 70 ng/bee. Guidelines for Washington state recommend that chlorpyrifos products should not be applied to flowering plants such as fruit trees within 4–6 days of blossoming to prevent bees from directly contacting the residue.

Risk assessments have primarily considered acute exposure, but more recently researchers have begun to investigate the effects of chronic, low-level exposure through residue in pollen and components of bee hives. A review of US studies, several European countries, Brazil and India found chlorpyrifos in nearly 15% of hive pollen samples and just over 20% of honey samples. Because of its high toxicity and prevalence in pollen and honey, bees are considered to have higher risk from chlorpyrifos exposure via their diet than from many other pesticides.

When exposed in the laboratory to chlorpyrifos at levels roughly estimated from measurements in hives, bee larvae experienced 60% mortality over 6 days, compared with 15% mortality in controls. Adult bees exposed to sub-lethal effects of chlorpyrifos (0.46 ng/bee) exhibited altered behaviors: less walking; more grooming, particularly of the head; more difficulty righting themselves; and unusual abdominal spasms. Chlorpyrifos oxon appears to particularly inhibit acetylcholinesterase in bee gut tissue as opposed to head tissue. Other organophosphate pesticides impaired bee learning and memory of smells in the laboratory.

== Regulation ==
=== International law ===
Chlorpyrifos is not regulated under international law or treaty. Organizations such as PANNA and the NRDC state that chlorpyrifos meets the four criteria (persistence, bioaccumulation, long-range transport, and toxicity) in Annex D of the Stockholm Convention on Persistent Organic Pollutants and should be restricted. In 2021, the European Union submitted a proposal to list chlorpyrifos in Annex A to the Stockholm Convention.

=== National regulations ===
Chlorpyrifos was used to control insect infestations of homes and commercial buildings in Europe until it was banned from sale in 2008. Chlorpyrifos is restricted from termite control in Singapore as of 2009. It was banned from residential use in South Africa as of 2010. It has been banned in the United Kingdom in 2016 apart from a limited use in drenching seedlings.

Chlorpyrifos has not been permitted for agricultural use in Sweden at all

==== United States ====
In the United States, several laws directly or indirectly regulate the use of pesticides. These laws, which are implemented by the EPA, NIOSH, USDA and FDA, include: the Clean Water Act (CWA); the Endangered Species Act (ESA); the Federal Insecticide, Fungicide, and Rodenticide Act (FIFRA); the Federal Food, Drug, and Cosmetic Act (FFDCA); the Comprehensive Environmental Response, Compensation, and Liability Act (CERCLA); and the Emergency Planning and Community Right-to-Know Act (EPCRA). As a pesticide, chlorpyrifos is not regulated under the Toxic Substances Control Act (TSCA).

Chlorpyrifos is sold in restricted-use products for certified pesticide applicators to use in agriculture and other settings, such as golf courses or for mosquito control. It may also be sold in ant and roach baits with childproof packaging. In 2000, manufacturers reached an agreement with the EPA to voluntarily restrict the use of chlorpyrifos in places where children may be exposed, including homes, schools and day care centers.

In 2007 Pesticide Action Network North America and Natural Resources Defense Council (collectively, PANNA) submitted an administrative petition requesting a chlorpyrifos ban, citing harm to the brains of developing children. On 10 August 2015, the Ninth Circuit Court of Appeals in PANNA v. EPA ordered the EPA to respond to PANNA's petition by "revok[ing] all tolerances for the insecticide chlorpyrifos", den[ying] the Petition or [issuing] a "proposed or final tolerance revocation" no later than 31 October 2015. The EPA was "unable to conclude that the risk from aggregate exposure from the use of chlorpyrifos [met] the safety standard of section 408(b)(2) of the Federal Food, Drug, and Cosmetic Act (FFDCA)" and therefore proposed "to revoke all tolerances for chlorpyrifos."

In an 30 October 2015 statement Dow AgroSciences disagreed with the EPA's proposed revocation and "remain[ed] confident that authorized uses of chlorpyrifos products, as directed, offer wide margins of protection for human health and safety." In a November 2016 press release, DOW argued that chlorpyrifos was "a critical tool for growers of more than 50 different types of crops in the United States" with limited or no viable alternatives." The Environment News Service quoted the Dow AgroSciences' statement disagreeing with the EPA findings.

Chlorpyrifos is one of the most widely used pest control products in the world. It is authorized for use in about 100 nations, including the U.S., Canada, the United Kingdom, Spain, France, Italy, Japan, Australia and New Zealand, where it is registered for protection of essentially every crop now under cultivation. No other pesticide has been more thoroughly tested.

— Statement Dow AgroSciences October 30, 2015

In November 2016, the EPA reassessed its ban proposal after taking into consideration recommendations made by the agency's Science Advisory Panel which had rejected the EPA's methodology in quantifying the risk posed by chlorpyrifos. Using a different methodology as suggested by the panel, the EPA retained its decision to completely ban chlorpyrifos. The EPA concluded that, while "uncertainties" remain, a number of studies provide "sufficient evidence" that children experience neurodevelopment effects even at low levels of chlorpyrifos exposure.

On 29 March 2017, EPA Administrator Scott Pruitt, appointed by the Trump administration, overturned the 2015 EPA revocation and denied the administrative petition by the Natural Resources Defense Council and the Pesticide Action Network North America to ban chlorpyrifos.

The American Academy of Pediatrics responded to the administration's decision saying they are "deeply alarmed" by Pruitt's decision to allow the pesticide's continued use. "There is a wealth of science demonstrating the detrimental effects of chlorpyrifos exposure to developing fetuses, infants, children and pregnant women. The risk to infant and children's health and development is unambiguous."

Asked in April whether Pruitt had met with Dow Chemical Company executives or lobbyists before his decision, an EPA spokesman replied: "We have had no meetings with Dow on this topic." In June, after several Freedom of Information Act requests, the EPA released a copy of Pruitt's March meeting schedule which showed that a meeting had been scheduled between Pruitt and Dow CEO Andrew Liveris at a hotel in Houston, Texas, on 9 March. Both men were featured speakers at an energy conference. An EPA spokesperson reported that the meeting was brief and the pesticide was not discussed.

In August, it was revealed that in fact Pruitt and other EPA officials had met with industry representatives on dozens of occasions in the weeks immediately prior to the March decision, promising them that it was "a new day" and assuring them that their wish to continue using chlorpyrifos had been heard. Ryan Jackson, Pruitt's chief of staff, said in an 8 March email that he had "scared" career staff into going along with the political decision to deny the ban, adding "[T]hey know where this is headed and they are documenting it well."

On 9 August 2018 the U.S. 9th Circuit court of Appeals ruled that the EPA must ban chlorpyrifos within 60 days from that date. A spokesman for Dow DuPont stated that "all appellate options" would be considered. In contrast, Marisa Ordonia, a lawyer for Earthjustice, the organization that had conducted much of the legal work on the case, hailed the decision. The ruling was almost immediately appealed by Trump administration lawyers.

On August 18, 2021, the U.S. Environmental Protection Agency (EPA) announced a ban on the use of chlorpyrifos on food crops in the United States.

On February 25, 2022, the EPA released a statement upholding its decision to revoke all tolerance standards on chlorpyrifos use, and sent letters to registered chlorpyrifos food producers confirming the ban to be in effect as of February 28, 2022.

On 14 December, 2022 the EPA filed a Notice of Intent to Cancel (NOIC) for three chlorpyrifos pesticide products because they bear labeling for use on food, despite the ban.

However, on November 2, 2023, the United States Court of Appeals for the Eighth Circuit nixed a 2021 rule issued by the EPA banning all neurotoxic insecticide on all food crops. The court concluded, that by deciding to ban all uses of chlorpyrifos on food plants, the EPA ignored the long standing American practice and prior court orders to evaluate each crop group on its own merits and "to keep a set of high-benefit uses in place." The court ordered the EPA to reevaluate whether "chlorpyrifos can be safely used on crops like sugar beets, soybeans, and certain fruits and vegetables".

Some states, including California, Hawaii, Maryland, New York, and Oregon, have banned chlorpyrifos on food grown and sold in their jurisdictions. Those bans remain in effect.

===== Residue =====
The use of chlorpyrifos in agriculture can leave chemical residue on food commodities. The FFDCA requires EPA to set limits, known as tolerances, for pesticide residue in human food and animal feed products based on risk quotients for acute and chronic exposure from food in humans. These tolerances limit the amount of chlorpyrifos that can be applied to crops. FDA enforces EPA's pesticide tolerances and determines "action levels" for the unintended drift of pesticide residues onto crops without tolerances.

After years of research without a conclusion and cognizant of the court order to issue a final ruling, the EPA proposed to eliminate all tolerances for chlorpyrifos ("Because tolerances are the maximum residue of a pesticide that can be in or on food, this proposed rule revoking all chlorpyrifos tolerances means that if this approach is finalized, all agricultural uses of chlorpyrifos would cease."), and then solicited comments.

The Dow Chemical Company is actively opposed to tolerance restrictions on chlorpyrifos and is currently lobbying the White House to, among other goals, pressure EPA to reverse its proposal to revoke chlorpyrifos food residue tolerances.

The EPA has not updated the approximately 112 tolerances pertaining to food products and supplies since 2006. However, in a 2016 report, EPA scientists had not been able to find any level of exposure to the pesticide that was safe. The EPA 2016 report states in part "... this assessment indicates that dietary risks from food alone are of concern ..." the report also states that previous published risk assessments for "chlorpyrifos may not provide a [sufficient] ... human health risk assessment given the potential for neurodevelopmental outcomes."

″The ... [food only] exposures for chlorpyrifos are of risk concern ... for all population subgroups analyzed. Children (1–2 years old) is the population subgroup with the highest risk estimate at 14,000% of the ssPADfood.″ (This acronym refers to the steady-state population-adjusted dose for food, which is considered the maximum safe oral dose.)

Based on 2006 EPA rules, chlorpyrifos has a tolerance of 0.1 part per million (ppm) residue on all food items unless a different tolerance has been set for that item or chlorpyrifos is not registered for use on that crop. EPA set approximately 112 tolerances pertaining to food products and supplies. In 2006, to reduce childhood exposure, the EPA amended its chlorpyrifos tolerance on apples, grapes and tomatoes, reducing the grape and apple tolerances to 0.01 ppm and eliminating the tolerance on tomatoes. Chlorpyrifos is not allowed on crops such as spinach, squash, carrots, and tomatoes; any chlorpyrifos residue on these crops normally represents chlorpyrifos misuse or spray drift.

Food handling establishments (places where food products are held, processed, prepared or served) are included in the food tolerance of 0.1 ppm for chlorpyrifos. Food handling establishments may use a 0.5% solution of chlorpyrifos solely for spot and/or crack and crevice treatments. Food items are to be removed or protected during treatment. Food handling establishment tolerances may be modified or exempted under FFDCA sec. 408.

===== Water =====
Chlorpyrifos in waterways is regulated as a hazardous substance under section 311(b)(2)(A) of the Federal Water Pollution Control Act and falls under the CWA amendments of 1977 and 1978. The regulation is inclusive of all chlorpyrifos isomers and hydrates in any solution or mixture. EPA has not set a drinking water regulatory standard for chlorpyrifos, but has established a drinking water guideline of 2 ug/L.

In 2009, to protect threatened salmon and steelhead under CWA and ESA, EPA and National Marine Fisheries Service (NMFS) recommended limits on the use of chlorpyrifos in California, Idaho, Oregon and Washington and requested that manufacturers voluntarily add buffer zones, application limits and fish toxicity to the standard labeling requirements for all chlorpyrifos-based products. Manufacturers rejected the request. In February 2013 in Dow AgroSciences vs NMFS, the Fourth Circuit Court of Appeals vacated EPA's order for these labeling requirements. In August 2014, in the settlement of a suit brought by environmental and fisheries advocacy groups against EPA in the U.S. District Court for the Western District of Washington, EPA agreed to re-instate no-spray stream buffer zones in California, Oregon and Washington, restricting aerial spraying (300 ft.) and ground-based applications (60 ft.) near salmon populations. These buffers will remain until EPA makes a permanent decision in consultation with NMFS.

===== Reporting =====
EPCRA designates the chemicals that facilities must report to the Toxics Release Inventory (TRI), based on EPA assessments. Chlorpyrifos is not on the reporting list. It is on the list of hazardous substances under CERCLA (aka the Superfund Act). In the event of an environmental release above its reportable quantity of 1 lb or 0.454 kg, facilities are required to immediately notify the National Response Center (NRC).

In 1995, Dow paid a $732,000 EPA penalty for not forwarding reports it had received on 249 chlorpyrifos poisoning incidents.

===== Occupational exposure =====
In 1989, OSHA established a workplace permissible exposure limit (PEL) of 0.2 mg/m3 for chlorpyrifos, based on an 8-hour time weighted average (TWA) exposure. However, the rule was remanded by the U.S. Circuit Court of Appeals and no PELs are in place presently.

EPA's Worker Protection Standard requires owners and operators of agricultural businesses to comply with safety protocols for agricultural workers and pesticide handlers (those who mix, load and apply pesticides). For example, in 2005, the EPA filed an administrative complaint against JSH Farms, Inc. (Wapato, Washington) with proposed penalties of $1,680 for using chlorpyrifos in 2004 without proper equipment. An adjacent property was contaminated with chlorpyrifos due to pesticide drift and the property owner suffered from eye and skin irritation.

===== State laws =====
Additional laws and guidelines may apply for individual US states. California, Hawaii, Maryland, New York, and Oregon, have banned chlorpyrifos on food grown and sold in their jurisdictions. These State bans remain in effect regardless whether chlorpyrifos is allowed on the federal level or not.

Oregon's Department of Environmental Quality added chlorpyrifos to the list of targeted reductions in the Clackamas Subbasin as part of the Columbia River National Strategic Plan, which is based on EPA'S 2006–11 National Strategic Plan.

In 2017, chlorpyrifos was included California's Proposition 65.

California included regulation limits for chlorpyrifos in waterways and established maximum and continuous concentration limits of 0.025 ppb and 0.015 ppb, respectively. Sale and possession of chlorpyrifos have been largely banned in California, as of 6 February – 31 December 2020, respectively. The California ban has an exception that, "a few products that apply chlorpyrifos in granular form, representing less than one percent of agricultural use of chlorpyrifos, will be allowed to remain on the market."

In Hawaii, a 2018 law introduced a complete ban on products containing chlorpyrifos, which went into effect on January 1, 2023. Before that, starting in 2019, the law mandated temporary application permits and annual reporting as well as mandating a 100-foot buffer around schools during school hours.

Florida did not ban chlorpyrifos completely, but introduced a concentration limit of 21 ug/L in drinking water.

In 2003, Dow agreed to pay $2 million to New York state, in response to a lawsuit to end Dow's advertising of Dursban as "safe".

==== Australia ====
Chlorpyrifos is used agriculturally in Australia but household use was restricted to low strength solutions in 2001 and banned in 2020. There are 49 registered chlorpyrifos insecticide products, mostly as 500 g/L emulsifiable concentrates.

The Australian Pesticides and Veterinary Medicine Authority's Chlorpyrifos Chemical Review, began July 2015, made the final decision in September 2024. Chlorpyrifos will continue to be used, though many uses of it are banned. The minimum technical grade chlorpyrifos purity is raised from 94% to 97% by weight.

==== Denmark ====
Chlorpyrifos was never approved for use in Denmark, except on ornamental plants grown in greenhouses. This use was banned in 2012.

==== European Union ====
On 6 December 2019, the European Union (EU) announced that it will no longer permit sales of chlorpyrifos after 31 January 2020.

The European Food Safety Authority released a statement in July 2019 which concluded that the approval criteria for chlorpyrifos which apply to human health are not met. Their literature review concluded that there is no evidence for reproductive toxicity in rats, but that chlorpyrifos is potentially genotoxic. The report stated that chlorpyrifos is clearly a potent acetylcholinesterase inhibitor, that it can be absorbed by ingestion, inhalation, and through the skin, and that epidemiological evidence supports the hypothesis that it is a human developmental neurotoxin that can cause early cognitive and behavioral deficits through prenatal exposure.

==== India ====
The FSSAI (Food Safety and Standards Authority of India) did not set a usage limits for chlorpyrifos. In 2010, India barred Dow from commercial activity for 5 years after India's Central Bureau of Investigation found Dow guilty of bribing Indian officials in 2007 to allow the sale of chlorpyrifos. In 2020, the Indian government had published a draft bill to ban 27 pesticides including chlorpyrifos.

==== New Zealand ====
Chlorpyrifos was previously approved in New Zealand for commercial use in crops, as a veterinary medicine, and as a timber treatment chemical. In July 2025 the Environmental Protection Authority announced that after reassessing the safety of the compound, approval for its use would be revoked. The ban included a 6-month phase out period of most products in use, with a longer 18-month phase out period for products designed to target grass grubs.

==== Thailand ====
Chlorpyrifos was banned under Thai law effective from 1 June 2020. Farmers were given 270 days to destroy their stock, while a 90-day deadline was also given to farmers to return the chemicals for destruction, as their possession is considered illegal by the Department of Agriculture. After deadline, any person who possesses the illegal agrochemicals will be fined one million baht, jailed for 10 years, or both.

==== Malaysia ====
Chlorpyrifos was banned under by Department of Agriculture for use in farming and agriculture with effective from year 2023. However it is still permitted for general use other than agriculture purpose.

==== Uganda ====
Chlorpyrifos is registered in Uganda, and as of December 2022, there are 28 registered chlorpyrifos products.

== Manufacture ==
Chlorpyrifos (3) is produced via a multistep synthesis from 3-methylpyridine, eventually reacting 3,5,6-trichloro-2-pyridinol (TCPy, 1) with O,O-diethyl phosphorochloridothioate (2).

Industrial synthesis of chlorpyrifos

== See also ==
- Organophosphate poisoning
