= Trimedoxime bromide =

Chemical compound

Clinical data
- Routes of administration: Intramuscular injection
- ATC code: None

Legal status
- Legal status: Experimental; in military use

Pharmacokinetic data
- Elimination half-life: 2 hours (mean)

Identifiers
- IUPAC name: 1,1′-propane-1,3-diylbis{4-[(E)-(hydroxyimino)methyl]pyridinium} dibromide
- CAS Number: 56-97-3
- PubChem CID: 5359236
- ChemSpider: 4514238
- UNII: ED0GXI9825
- CompTox Dashboard (EPA): DTXSID101036063
- ECHA InfoCard: 100.000.276

Chemical and physical data
- Formula: C_{15}H_{18}Br_{2}N_{4}O_{2}
- Molar mass: 446.143 g·mol^{−1}

Trimedoxime bromide (INN), also known as dipyroxime or TMB-4, is an oxime used in the treatment of organophosphate poisoning It is chemically related to asoxime, pralidoxime, and obidoxime.
