= C14H16N4O3 =

The molecular formula C_{14}H_{16}N_{4}O_{3} (molar mass: 288.302 g/mol, exact mass: 288.1222 u) may refer to:

- Obidoxime
- Piromidic acid
