= Carbamate poisoning =

Toxic effect of insecticides

Carbamate poisoning is poisoning due to exposure to carbamates, which are commonly sold as pesticides around the world. In most respects, it is similar to organophosphate poisoning, though typically less severe or requiring a larger amount of the chemical before symptoms appear.

== Symptoms ==
The array of symptoms typically seen in carbamate poisoning include both muscarinic and nicotinic symptoms. Muscarinic receptor effects include:

- Bradycardia, or reduced heart rate
- Bronchospasm, or tightening of the bronchioles of the lungs
- Miosis, or constriction of the pupils
- Vomiting and abdominal pain
- Diarrhea
- Excessive sweating and salivation

Bronchospasm is a potential life threat, especially when combined with nicotinic effects on the respiratory muscles. Bradycardia can be life-threatening in people with preexisting heart conditions. The combination of sweating, diarrhea, and vomiting can lead to severe dehydration, hypovolemia, and death from hypovolemic shock.

Nicotinic symptoms of carbamate poisoning are caused by weakness, tremors, and fasciculations of muscles across the body. The most notable consequence of this is usually respiratory failure, as the diaphragm and other muscles become too weak to facilitate normal breathing.

Symptoms of the central nervous system are possible, but are less frequent and severe than those associated with organophosphate poisoning. Possible symptoms include:

- Headache
- Anxiety
- Agitation
- Ataxia
- Seizures, which may progress to a coma
- Apnea caused by disruption of the respiratory center of the brain

=== Similarity to organophosphorus ===
Symptoms are overall similar to organophosphate poisoning. However, several notable differences exist: unlike organophosphates, carbamates do not cause covalent bonds to form between the chemical and acetylcholinesterase. This means that organophosphates, but not carbamates, can cause respiratory failure several days or weeks after exposure to the chemical, while also resisting antidote administration. Carbamate poisoning does not cause long-term effects.

== Pathogenesis ==
Most cases of carbamate poisoning are due to exposure to pesticide products containing the chemical. The most common carbamate chemicals in use are captan, ferbam, carbofuran, carbaryl, and aldicarb. Suicidal and homicidal poisonings also occur, but are rare, due to the lower lethality of carbamates in humans compared to other toxic substances.

Like organophosphates, carbamates are toxic because of their ability to bind to and inhibit acetylcholinesterase (AChE). AChE is an enzyme found throughout the human body that breaks down acetylcholine (ACh), a neurotransmitter that causes muscle cells to contract, among other functions. Without AChE, acetylcholine builds up in the neuromuscular junction, eventually saturating the receptors in the junction and causing the muscle cell to contract uncontrollably. In large muscles such as the diaphragm, the muscle cells may use up their energy reserves and be unable to contract any more, resulting in weakness and tremors.

== Treatment ==
The primary treatment for carbamate poisoning involves decontamination and supportive care, with a focus on keeping the airway open. This is often achieved with the use of nasopharyngeal or oropharyngeal airway devices. Activated charcoal is often administered in cases where the substance was ingested, to limit further absorption of the toxin. In severe cases, atropine may be used as an antidote to counteract the effects of carbamates on the nervous system. Pralidoxime, another antidote, can be considered to reactivate inhibited acetylcholinesterase enzymes, although this is often less important for carbamate poisoning than it is for organophosphate poisoning.

The most common cause of death following carbamate poisoning is respiratory failure. Because of this, the most urgent treatment approaches center around ensuring that the patient's airway remains open. This may also involve the use of vacuum suction devices to remove saliva, which (due to the effects of the poison) can be produced in a high enough volume to drown the patient. Intubation and ventilation are sometimes used, in severe cases.

Atropine and pralidoxime are often packaged together in an auto-injector device, and are thus used together in the treatment of most cases.

== See also ==
- Organophosphate poisoning
- Muscarinic agonist
