= Organophosphate-induced delayed neuropathy =

- Other names: Organophosphate-induced delayed polyneuropathy
- Specialty: Neurology

Organophosphate-induced delayed neuropathy (OPIDN), also called organophosphate-induced delayed polyneuropathy (OPIDP), is a neuropathy caused by killing of neurons in the central nervous system, especially in the spinal cord, as a result of acute or chronic organophosphate poisoning.

A striking example of OPIDN occurred during the 1930s Prohibition Era when thousands of men in the American South and Midwest developed arm and leg weakness and pain after drinking a "medicinal alcohol substitute". The drink, called "Ginger Jake," contained an adulterated Jamaican ginger extract containing tri-ortho-cresyl phosphate (TOCP) which resulted in partially reversible neurologic damage. The disorder was known as "jake paralysis", "jake leg" or "jake walk", which were terms frequently used in the blues music of the period. Europe and Morocco both experienced outbreaks of OPIDN from contaminated abortifacients and cooking oil, respectively.

The disorder may contribute to the chronic multisymptom illnesses of the Gulf War veterans as well as aerotoxic syndrome (especially tricresyl phosphate poisoning)

The exact biochemical mechanism of the syndrome is unknown, although it has been associated with organophosphate driven inhibition of patatin-like phospholipase domain-containing protein 6. There is no specific treatment, and recovery is usually incomplete, affecting only sensory nervous system, while motor neuropathy persists.

== See also ==
- Aerotoxic syndrome
- Gulf War syndrome
