= Jamaica ginger =

19th-century patent medicine

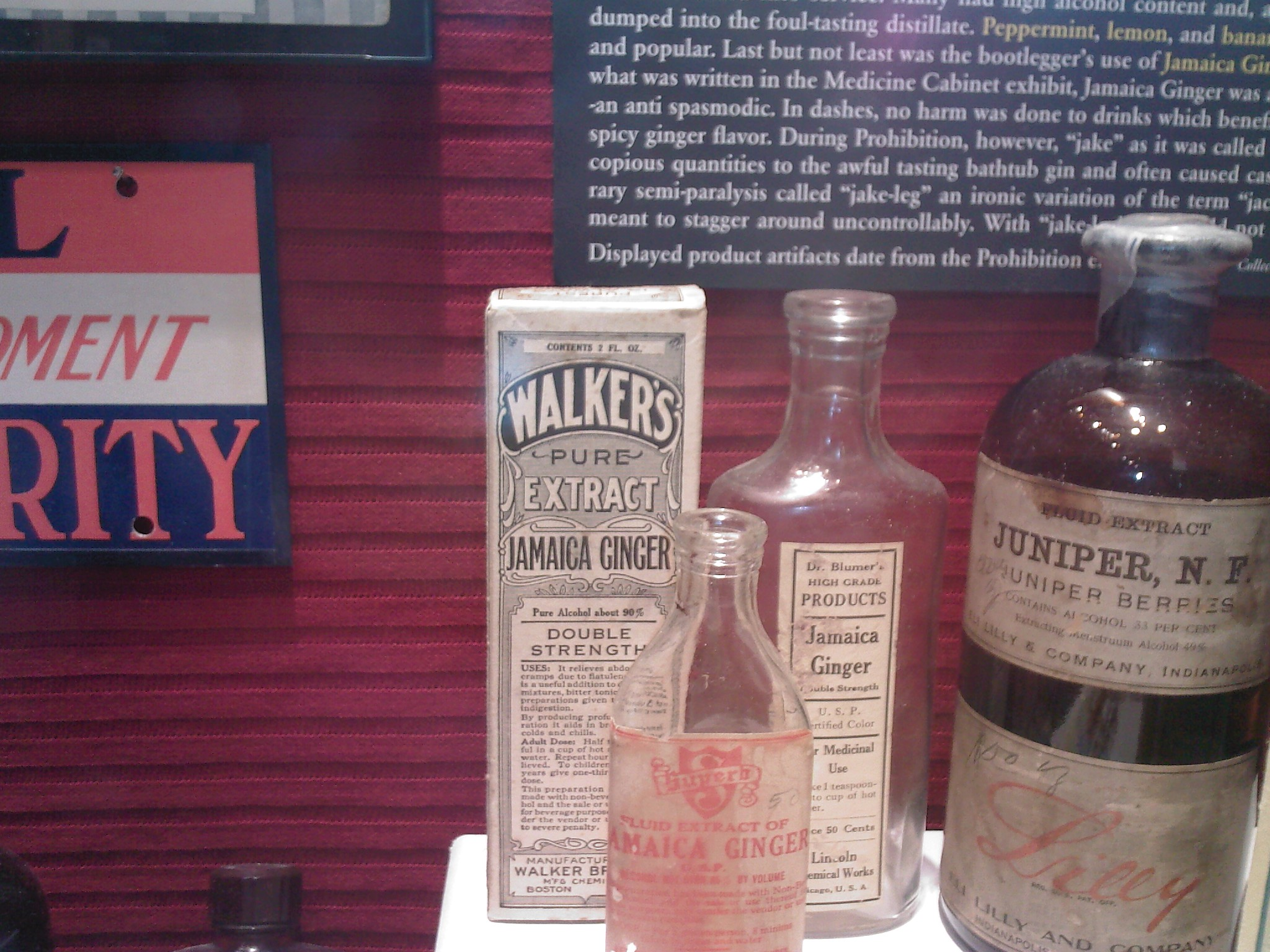
Bottles of Jamaica ginger on display at Museum of American Cocktail

Tri-ortho cresyl phosphate(TOCP), also called tricresyl phosphate, was the neurotoxin responsible for the paralysis associated with "Jake Walk."

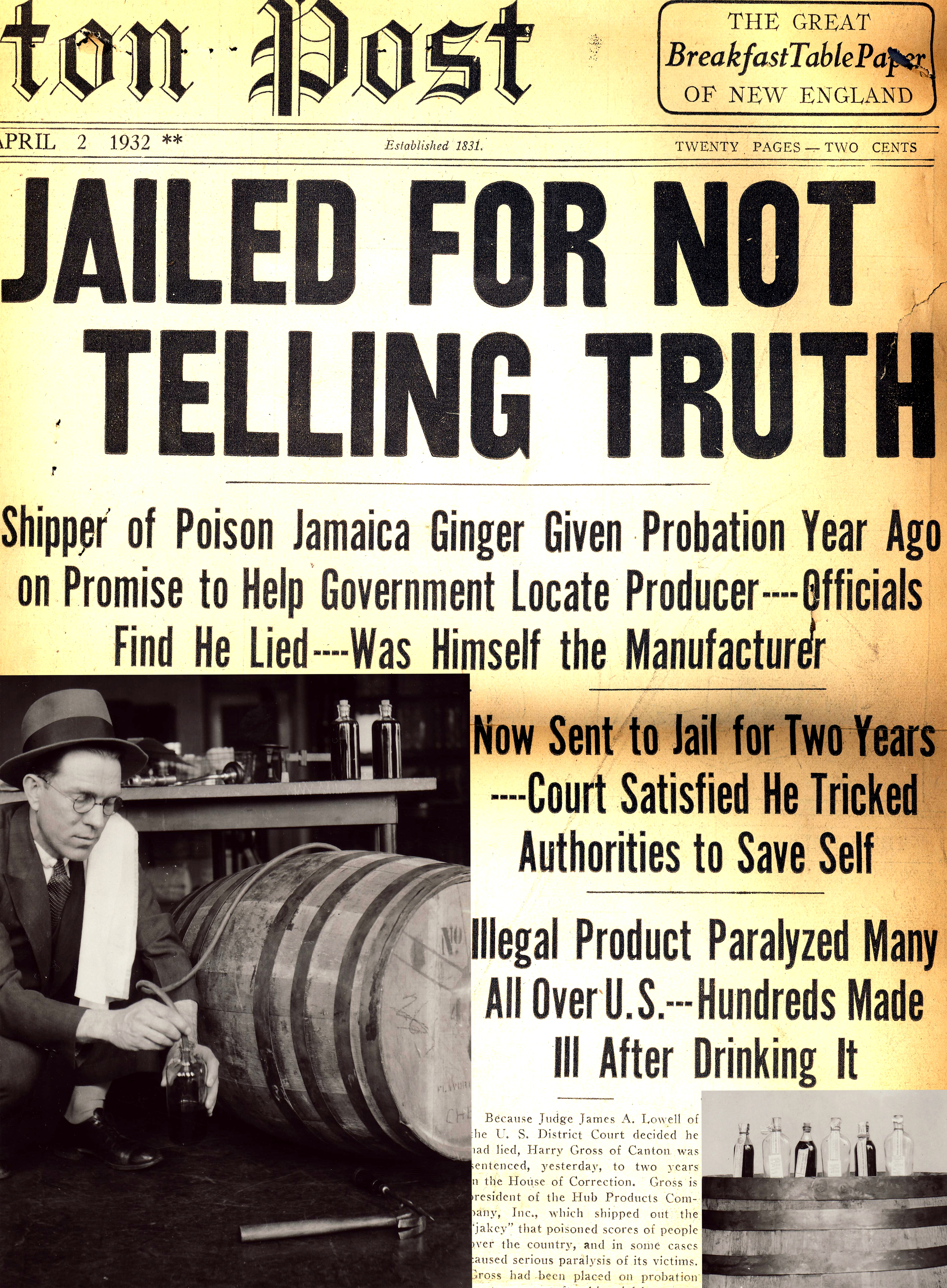
Sampling "Ginger Jake", April 2, 1932, The Boston Times

Jamaica ginger extract, known in the United States by the slang name Jake, was a late 19th-century patent medicine that provided a convenient way to obtain alcohol during the era of Prohibition, since it contained approximately 70% to 80% ethanol by weight. In the 1930s, a large number of users of Jamaica ginger were afflicted with a paralysis of the hands and feet due to the presence of an undeclared adulterant, tricresyl phosphate.

== Composition ==
While the drink was essentially a tincture of ginger root, the US government required solid material to be added with the intention of making it less palatable and thus less prone to abuse. The solids expected to be added were particles of ginger root, which made the "medicine" unpalatable. Manufacturers sought solids which impaired the taste less; tricresyl phosphate was used, which the producers later found to be a potent neurotoxin; adulterated Jake is estimated to have caused 30,000 to 50,000 people to lose function in their limbs. Trust in Jamaica Ginger was lost, and its production was discontinued. Similar ginger-based patent medicines in single-serving bottles, marketed as an immune system booster, have since reappeared in convenience stores and other retailers, but no longer contain any alcohol or organophosphates.

== History ==
Since the 1860s, Jamaica ginger had been widely sold at drug stores and roadside stands in two-US-fluid-ounce (60 ml) bottles. In small doses, mixed with water, it was used as a remedy for headaches, upper respiratory infections, menstrual disorders, and intestinal gas. Despite the drink's strong and somewhat unpleasant taste, it was popular as an alcoholic beverage in dry counties in the United States, where it was a convenient and legal method of obtaining alcohol when mixed with a soft drink to improve the taste.

When Prohibition was enacted in 1920, sale of alcohol became illegal nationwide, prompting consumers to search for substitutes. Patent medicines with a high alcohol percentage, such as Jamaica ginger, became obvious choices, as they were legal and available over the counter without prescriptions. By 1921, the United States government made the original formulation of Jamaica ginger prescription-only. Only a fluid extract version defined in the United States Pharmacopeia, with a high content of bitter-tasting ginger oleoresin, remained available in stores. Because of the taste, it was classified as nonpotable, and was therefore legal to sell despite the alcohol content.

United States Department of Agriculture agents audited Jamaica ginger manufacturers by boiling samples and weighing the resulting solids, to make sure their products contained sufficiently high quantities of the bitter-tasting ginger. To make their products more palatable when used recreationally, manufacturers of Jamaica ginger began to illegally replace the ginger oleoresin with cheaper ingredients like molasses, glycerin, and castor oil, cutting costs and significantly diminishing the unpleasant ginger flavor whilst still appearing to pass the residual solids test.

== Organophosphate-induced delayed neuropathy ==
When the price of castor oil increased in the latter portion of the 1920s, Harry Gross, president of Hub Products Corporation, sought an alternative additive for his Jamaica ginger formula. He discarded ethylene glycol and diethylene glycol as being too volatile, eventually selecting triorthocresyl phosphate (TOCP), a plasticizer used in lacquers and paint finishing. Gross was advised by the manufacturer of the chemical, Celluloid Corporation, that it was non-toxic.

TOCP was originally thought to be non-toxic; however, it was later determined to be a neurotoxin that causes axonal damage to the nerve cells in the nervous system of mammals, especially those located in the spinal cord. The resulting type of paralysis is now referred to as organophosphate-induced delayed neuropathy, or OPIDN.

In 1930, large numbers of Jake users began to find they were unable to use their hands and feet. Some victims could walk, but they had no control over the muscles which would normally have enabled them to point their toes upward. Therefore, they would raise their feet high with the toes flopping downward, which would touch the pavement first followed by their heels. The toe first, heel second pattern made a distinctive "tap-click, tap-click" sound as they walked. This very peculiar gait became known as the jake walk or the jake dance and those afflicted were said to have jake leg, jake foot, or jake paralysis. Additionally, the calves of the legs would soften and hang down and the muscles between the thumbs and fingers would atrophy.

Within a few months, the TOCP-adulterated Jake was identified as the cause of the paralysis, and the contaminated Jake was recovered. But by that time, it was too late for many victims. Some did recover full, or partial, use of their limbs. But for most, the loss was permanent. The total number of victims was never accurately determined, but is frequently quoted as between 30,000 and 50,000. Many victims were immigrants to the United States, and most were poor, with little political or social influence. The victims received very little assistance. Harry Gross and his part-owner of Boston-Hub Products, Max Reisman, were ultimately fined $1,000 each and given a two-year suspended jail sentence.

Several blues songs on the subject were recorded in the early 1930s, such as "Jake Walk Papa" by Asa Martin, and "Jake Liquor Blues" by Ishman Bracey.

Although this incident became well known, later cases of organophosphate poisoning occurred in Germany, Spain, Italy, and, on a large scale, in Morocco in 1959, where cooking oil adulterated with jet engine lubricant from an American airbase led to paralysis in approximately 10,000 victims, causing an international incident.

== Cultural references ==
=== Books ===
- In Sara Gruen's 2006 novel Water for Elephants jake paralysis afflicts one character, Camel, after drinking contaminated Jamaica Ginger.
- In the novel The Black Dahlia, the protagonist reveals early on that his mother went blind and fell to her death after drinking jake, leading to his resentment of his father for purchasing it.
- In his autobiography On the Move: A Life, Oliver Sacks describes research that he conducted to develop an animal model of jake paralysis. He was able to duplicate the toxic effects of TOCP on myelinated neurons in earthworms and chickens.
- In Jamie Ford's novel Hotel on the Corner of Bitter and Sweet the two young characters Henry and Keiko are given a prescription for Jamaican Ginger in the 1942 portion of the story. They go to the pharmacy, pick up the bottles, and return to the Black Elks club. Due to war rationing and systemic oppression at the time, the black jazz club is not allowed to have a liquor license, so the proprietor uses Jamaican Ginger to make bathtub gin.

=== Music ===
Songs were recorded at the time about "jake" and its effects; in a variety of musical styles, including blues and country. Several have been included on the compilation albums Jake Walk Blues (1977, 14 songs) and Jake Leg Blues (1994, 16 songs) There is a marked but unsurprising duplication of songs between those albums. In some cases, different artists used the same title for different songs. The songs on one or both of those albums are, in alphabetic order by title:

- "Alcohol and Jake Blues" – Tommy Johnson (1930, Paramount 12950)
- "Bay Rum Blues" - David McCarn and Howard Long
- "Bear Cat Papa Blues" – Gene Autry and Frankie Marvin (1931, unreleased)
- "Beer Drinkin' Woman" - Black Ace
- "Got the Jake Leg Too" - The Ray Brothers (1930, Victor V-23508)
- "Jake Bottle Blues" - Lemuel Turner (1928, Victor V-40052)
- "Jake Head Boogie" - Lightnin' Hopkins (c. 1949-1950)
- "Jake Jigga Juke" - Iron Mike Norton (2005, GFO Records)
- "Jake Leg Blues" - Willie ("Poor Boy") Lofton (1935, Decca 7076)
- "Jake Leg Blues" - Mississippi Sheiks with Bo Carter (1930, Okeh 8939)
- "Jake Leg Rag" - W. T. ("Willie") Narmour and S. W. ("Shell" or "Shellie") Smith
- "Jake Leg Wobble" - The Ray Brothers (1930, Victor V-40291)
- "Jake Legs Blues" - Maynard Britton
- "Jake Legs Blues" - Byrd Moore
- "Jake Liquor Blues" - Ishmon Bracey (1929, Paramount 12941)
- "Jake Walk Blues" - The Allen Brothers (1931, Victor V-40303)
- "Jake Walk Blues" - Maynard Britton
- "Jake Walk Papa" - Asa Martin (1933)
- "Limber Neck Rag" - W. T. Narmour and S. W. Smith

Other musical references include:

- Savannah, Georgia-based band Baroness recorded a song called "Jake Leg" for their album Blue Record.

=== Film and television ===
- Jamaica ginger ("Ginger Jake") is a plot element in two episodes of The Untouchables, an American TV series. "The Jamaica Ginger Story" aired in season 2 on February 2, 1961. "Jake Dance" aired on January 22, 1963.
- "Ginger Jake" also makes an appearance in the movie Quid Pro Quo, where "wannabes" (people who would like to be disabled) are helped by Ginger Jake to become disabled.

== See also ==
- Hadacol
- Surrogate alcohol
