= TCPy =

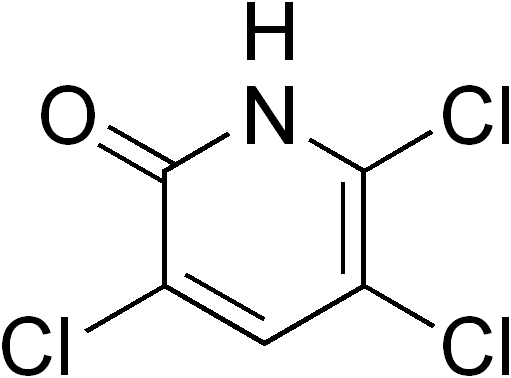

Names
- Preferred IUPAC name 3,5,6-Trichloropyridin-2(1H)-one

Identifiers
CAS Number	6515-38-4
3D model (JSmol)	Interactive image
ChemSpider	21541
ECHA InfoCard	100.026.733
PubChem CID	23017
UNII	JS52YZJ84A
CompTox Dashboard (EPA)	DTXSID7038317
- InChI: InChI=1S/C5H2Cl3NO/c6-2-1-3(7)5(10)9-4(2)8/h1H,(H,9,10) Key: WCYYAQFQZQEUEN-UHFFFAOYSA-N; InChI=1/C5H2Cl3NO/c6-2-1-3(7)5(10)9-4(2)8/h1H,(H,9,10) Key: WCYYAQFQZQEUEN-UHFFFAOYAM
- SMILES: O=C1C(Cl)=CC(Cl)=C(Cl)N1

Properties
Chemical formula	C_{5}H_{2}Cl_{3}NO
Molar mass	198.43 g·mol^{−1}
Density	1.67g/cm^{3}
Melting point	172 to 174 °C (342 to 345 °F; 445 to 447 K)
Boiling point	254.8 °C (490.6 °F; 528.0 K) at 760 mmHg

Hazards
Flash point	107.9 °C (226.2 °F; 381.0 K)
- Except where otherwise noted, data are given for materials in their standard state (at 25 °C [77 °F], 100 kPa). verify (what is ?) Infobox references

TCPy or 3,5,6-trichloro-2-pyridinol is a cyclic hydrocarbon, specifically a chlorinated version of 2-pyridone.

Pesticides can be a precursor to TCPy. TCPy is a metabolite of the herbicide triclopyr, and of the insecticides chlorpyrifos and chlorpyrifos-methyl. A study in Massachusetts reported a correlation between exposure to TCPy and lower testosterone levels in men. According to this source, exposure is "widespread" and of "potential public health importance".
