= Oil soldiers =

Swiss army poisoning incident, 1940

Oil soldiers (German Ölsoldaten) is the name given to soldiers of the Swiss Army poisoned by accident in 1940, when they were served Käseschnitten (fried bread with cheese) in which mineral oil mixed with tricresyl phosphate, intended as a coolant for machine guns, was mistakenly used for the preparation of the dish.

== Course of events ==
On July 29, 1940, peanut oil, used in the preparation of food for a company (Mitr Kp IV/52) in Ramiswil, canton of Solothurn, was mixed with machine gun cooling oil by mistake and used to make a cheese dish (Käseschnitten). That happened because, after a drill, the coolant was stored in cooking oil cans that were not marked properly, and the oil was indistinguishable from cooking oil by taste or appearance.

That led to 74 soldiers and 10 to 12 civilians suffering from tricresyl phosphate poisoning, causing paralysis of the legs which in some cases was grave and irreversible. There were civilians, including children, among the victims of the poisoning because some of the soldiers had shared their rations. 32 of the cases were registered as "grave", 20 of them as "total invalidity". Later the same year, a similar incident affected the Schwyz Gebirgsmitrailleurkompanie IV/72 where at least 17 soldiers suffered permanent health damage after a salad was prepared with cooling oil.

== Impact ==
The case of the "oil soldiers" was widely publicised and discussed in Switzerland. In 1947, the first broadcast of Swiss Solidarity in the German-speaking part of Switzerland was used for a fundraising campaign to help them. A foundation ("Stiftung Vergiftungspatienten") was created to support the disabled. The incidents triggered a revision of the Swiss military insurance law. Swiss military insurance had paid a total of 46.1 million Swiss Francs to the "oil soldiers" by 2015. Legally, the incident was treated as an accident, and only the battalion doctor was convicted, being sentenced to 45 days in prison for negligence of duty. He had repeatedly refused to visit the sick soldiers on the evening of the poisoning because he did not think it was a serious matter. The last surviving "oil soldier" was Christoph von Blarer, who died on April 8, 2014, in Aesch, Basel-Landschaft, aged 98.

== Sources ==
- Balz Ruchti: Das Gift von 1940, in: Der Beobachter, 16. Dezember 2011
- Franziska Gebel, Alois Fässler: Ölsoldaten. Statistik der Militärversicherung 2016, p. 53–59. Online (PDF)
