= Tricresyl phosphate =

Tri-ortho-cresyl phosphate

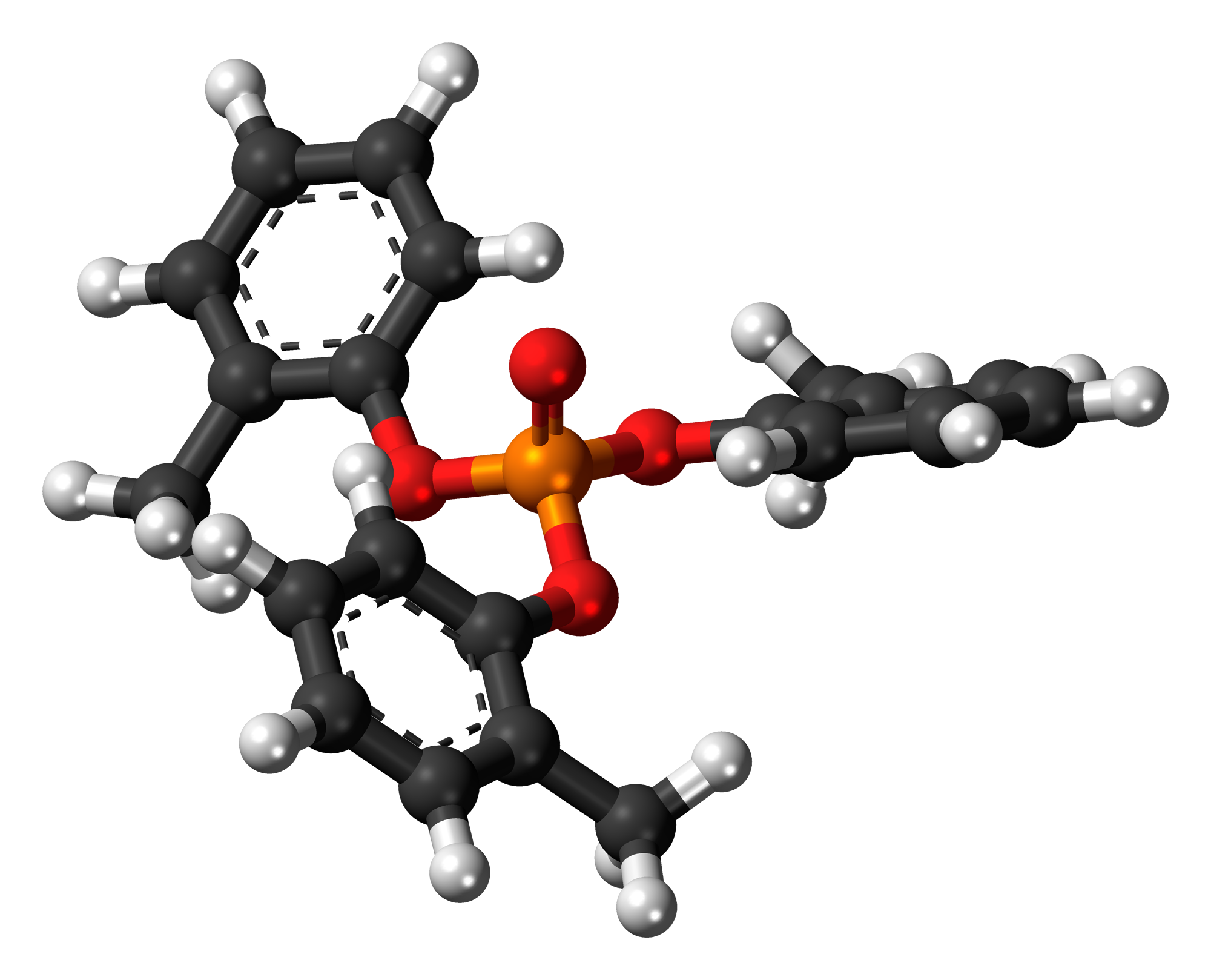

Names
- Preferred IUPAC name Tris(2-methylphenyl) phosphate
- Other names tri-o-cresyl phosphate TOCP tritolyl phosphate, ortho-isomer tri-o-tolyl ester of phosphoric acid triorthocresyl phosphate (TOCP)

Identifiers
CAS Number	o-: 78-30-8; mixed isomers: 1330-78-5
3D model (JSmol)	o-: Interactive image
ChEMBL	o-: ChEMBL3181798
ChemSpider	o-: 21106216
ECHA InfoCard	100.014.136
PubChem CID	o-: 6527
RTECS number	o-: TD0350000
UNII	o-: X8II18JD0A; mixed isomers: 512641US16
UN number	2574
CompTox Dashboard (EPA)	o-: DTXSID6032192
- InChI: InChI=1S/C21H21O4P/c1-16-10-4-7-13-19(16)23-26(22,24-20-14-8-5-11-17(20)2)25-21-15-9-6-12-18(21)3/h4-15H,1-3H3 Key: YSMRWXYRXBRSND-UHFFFAOYSA-N; o-: InChI=1/C21H21O4P/c1-16-10-4-7-13-19(16)23-26(22,24-20-14-8-5-11-17(20)2)25-21-15-9-6-12-18(21)3/h4-15H,1-3H3 Key: YSMRWXYRXBRSND-UHFFFAOYAP
- SMILES: o-: Cc3ccccc3OP(=O)(Oc1ccccc1C)Oc2ccccc2C

Properties
Chemical formula	C_{21}H_{21}O_{4}P
Molar mass	368.369 g·mol^{−1}
Appearance	colourless liquid
Melting point	−40 °C (−40 °F; 233 K)
Boiling point	255 °C (491 °F; 528 K) (10 mmHg)

Hazards
- GHS labelling
Pictograms	(GHS08: Health hazard) (GHS09: Environmental hazard)
Signal word	Danger
Hazard statements	H370, H411
Precautionary statements	P260, P264, P270, P273, P307+P311, P321, P391, P405, P501
NFPA 704 (fire diamond)	1 1 0
Flash point	> 225 °C (437 °F; 498 K)
- Except where otherwise noted, data are given for materials in their standard state (at 25 °C [77 °F], 100 kPa). verify (what is ?) Infobox references

Tricresyl phosphate (TCP) is a mixture of organophosphate compounds most notably used as a flame retardant. Other uses include as a plasticizer in manufacturing for lacquers and varnishes and vinyl plastics and as an antiwear additive in lubricants. Pure tricresyl phosphate is a colourless, viscous liquid, although commercial samples are typically yellow. It is virtually insoluble in water, but easily soluble in organic solvents like toluene, hexane, and diethyl ether among others. It was synthesized by Alexander Williamson in 1854 upon reacting phosphorus pentachloride with cresol (a mixture of para-, ortho-, and meta- isomers of methylphenol), though today's manufacturers can prepare TCP by mixing cresol with phosphorus oxychloride or phosphoric acid as well. The ortho isomer of TCP is a rather toxic substance with a long history of causing mass poisonings.

== Isomers ==
Many isomers of tricresyl phosphate exist and comprise typical samples of this compound. Neurotoxicity is believed to be restricted to isomers containing ortho-cresyl groups.

The most toxic isomer was initially thought to be the ooo-isomer, tri-ortho-cresyl phosphate (TOCP). The World Health Organization stated in 1990 that "Because of considerable variation among individuals in sensitivity to TOCP, it is not possible to establish a safe level of exposure" and "Both the pure ortho isomer and isomeric mixtures containing TOCP are, therefore, considered major hazards to human health." However, isomers with a lower proportion of ortho-cresyl groups are now known to be most dangerous. Di-ortho-cresyl isomers (oom-, oop-) are reported to be five times more toxic than TOCP, and mono-ortho isomers (omm-, omp-, opp-) ten times more toxic.

Strenuous efforts have been made to minimize the content of ortho isomers in commercial TCP if there is a risk of human exposure. However other isomers present in synthetic jet engine oils do inhibit certain enzymes.

== Toxicity ==
TCP has very low acute toxicity, but it is transformed in the body to a highly toxic metabolite.

In humans, the first symptoms are weakness/paralysis of the hands and feet on both sides of the body due to damage to the peripheral nervous system (polyneuropathy) and a sensation of pins-and-needles (paresthesia). Onset typically occurs between 3–28 days from initial exposure. If ingested, this can be preceded by gastrointestinal symptoms that include nausea, vomiting, and diarrhea. Rates of metabolism vary by species and by individual; some people developed severe polyneuropathy after ingesting 0.15g of TOCP, whereas others have been reported asymptomatic after 1-2g. Though death is uncommon in acute exposure cases, the result of paralysis can last for months or years due to differences in gender, age, and route of exposure. The cardinal treatment is physical therapy to restore the use of the hands and feet, though it can take up to 4 years to only regain a fraction of motor control.

Exposure to TOCP has been characterized by a list of observations:

- Cholinesterase levels will remain unchanged or show no significant changes.
- Electromyography will show partial or complete reactions of degeneration.
- An increase of protein in cerebrospinal fluid.
- Swelling of the parotid glands (non-tender).

=== Metabolism ===
The toxication mechanism of TOCP

Although TOCP is mainly excreted through urine and feces, it is partially metabolized by the hepatic cytochrome P450 system. Pathways include hydroxylation at one or more methyl groups, dearylation (removal of a o-cresyl group) and conversion of the hydroxymethyl groups to an aldehyde or a carboxylic acid.

Human metabolism results in a saligenin cyclic o-tolyl phosphate (SCOTP) metabolite, an known enzyme inhibitor. This metabolite is able to inhibit neuropathy target esterase (NTE) and results in the classic organophosphate-induced delayed neuropathy (OPIDN). In tandem, TOCP exerts physical damage by causing axonal destruction and myelin disintegration within specialized cells that transmit nerve impulses (neurons).

In addition to the formation of SCOTP, the interactions between TOCP and two different human cytochrome P450 complexes (1A2 and 3A4) can further produce 2-(ortho-cresyl)-4H-1,2,3-benzodioxaphosphoran-2-one (CBDP). This metabolite can bind to butyrylcholinesterase (BuChE) and/or acetylcholinesterase (AChE).

Binding to BuChE results in no adverse effects, for its typical role is to covalently bind to organophosphate poisons and detoxify them by inactivation. The dangers in metabolizing TOCP to CBDP occur when its potential to bind to AChE become imminent, for inactivation of the enzyme in nerve synapses can be lethal. The enzyme plays a tantamount role in terminating nerve impulse transmission "by hydrolyzing the neurotransmitter acetylcholine." Upon inactivation, acetylcholine can no longer be broken down in the body and results in uncontrollable muscle spasms, paralyzed breathing (bradycardia), convulsions, and/or death. Luckily, TOCP is considered a weak AChE inhibitor.

== Health calamities from TCP ==
The earliest known mass poisoning event by TOCP occurred in 1899 when six French hospital patients were given a medication containing this compound. Pharmacist Jules Brissonet had synthesized this compound in the hopes of treating tuberculosis, but soon after administration all six patients developed polyneuropathy. The original paper described this medication to be:

A bland, limpid liquid, nearly tasteless and odourless, which is not irritating to the gastric mucous membranes. When creosote is combined with phosphoric acid the metabolic action produced is much more marked, and Phosote can be tolerated in larger doses and for a longer continuance than Creosote or Guaiacol. Dose of the preparation, one to two grammes three times a day.

The greatest mass poisoning by TOCP occurred in 1930 when it was added as an adulterant to the popular drink Jamaica ginger, also known as Ginger Jake, during the United States Prohibition era. Jake was listed as a cure for "assorted ailments" in the U.S. Pharmocopoeia and thus easy to obtain; as it had a high alcohol content it was used as a way to obtain alcohol legally. Up to 100,000 people were poisoned and 5,000 paralyzed when a manufacturer of Ginger Jake added Lindol—a compound that consisted mainly of TOCP—to their product. The reason for why TOCP was found in Ginger Jake is disputed; one source claims it was to further extract the Jamaica root, another source claims it was to water the drink down, and yet another source claims it was a result of contamination from lubricating oils. Binges of Ginger Jake resulted in what was known to be a "Jake walk", in which patients experienced a highly irregular gait caused by numbness in the legs, followed by eventual paralysis of the wrists and feet. In medical journals it was described to have produced an organophosphate-induced delayed neuropathy (OPIDN) neurodegenerative syndrome, "characterized by distal axonal lesions, ataxia, and neuronal degeneration in the spinal cord and peripheral nervous systems."

In 1932, 60 European women experienced TOCP poisoning due to the abortion-inducing (abortifacient) drug apiol, which was adulterated with TCP. Those who took the pill experienced comas, convulsions, paralysis of the lower body (paraplegia) and often death. Apiol was subsequently criticized by doctors, journalists, and activists until it was discontinued, citing that the dangers were too great and the number of poisonings was likely higher than accounted for.

Other mass poisonings include:

- In 1937, 60 South Africans were poisoned after using contaminated cooking oil that had been stored in drums that previously stored lubricating oil.
- In two separate incidents in 1940, 74, and at least 17, men in units of the Swiss army experienced a similar outbreak when their cooking oil was contaminated with machine gun oil. They became known as the "Oil soldiers".
- In the 1950s, 11 South Africans used water from drums from a paint factory that previously stored TOCP.
- 10,000 people in Morocco were poisoned in 1959, when they consumed cooking oil contaminated with jet-plane lubricating oil.
- Hundreds of Germans in the cities of Eckernförde (1941) and Kiel (1945) when torpedo-lubricants were used as a cooking oil replacement, "organised" from the "black market". That was common, for example after World War I, because torpedo oil was of natural origin but, in World War II, TOCP was added for thermic purposes. Severe physical and neurological damage was experienced, and the illness was called the Eckernförde disease.
- In 1977 in Sri Lanka, 20 Tamil girls were poisoned by TCP-contaminated sesame oil.
