= Obidoxime =

Chemical compound

Clinical data
- ATC code: V03AB13 (WHO)

Pharmacokinetic data
- Excretion: Renal

Identifiers
- IUPAC name: 1,1'-[oxybis(methylene)]bis{4-[(E)- (hydroxyimino)methyl]pyridinium}
- CAS Number: 7683-36-5 114-90-9 (chloride)
- PubChem CID: 5485192
- ChemSpider: 4588647
- UNII: N6KNE1QA9O
- ChEMBL: ChEMBL451635
- CompTox Dashboard (EPA): DTXSID70921258
- ECHA InfoCard: 100.003.690

Chemical and physical data
- Formula: C_{14}H_{16}N_{4}O_{3}^{+2}
- Molar mass: 288.307 g·mol^{−1}
- 3D model (JSmol): Interactive image
- SMILES: c1c(cc[n+](c1)COC[n+]2ccc(cc2)/C=N\O)/C=N\O
- InChI: InChI=1S/C14H14N4O3/c19-15-9-13-1-5-17(6-2-13)11-21-12-18-7-3-14(4-8-18)10-16-20/h1-10H,11-12H2/p+2; Key:HIGRLDNHDGYWQJ-UHFFFAOYSA-P

Obidoxime is a member of the oxime family used to treat organophosphate poisoning. Oximes are drugs known for their ability to reverse the binding of organophosphorus compounds to the enzyme acetylcholinesterase (AChE).

AChE is an enzyme that removes acetylcholine from the synapse after it creates the required stimulation on the next nerve cell. If it gets inhibited, acetylcholine is not removed after the stimulation and multiple stimulations are made, resulting in muscle contractions and paralysis.

Organophosphates such as nerve gases are well-known inhibitors of AChE. They bind to a specific place on the enzyme and prevent it from functioning normally by changing the OH group on the serine residue and by protonating (quaternary nitrogen, R_{4}N^{+}) the nearby nitrogen atom located in the histidine residue.

== Function ==
Oximes such as obidoxime, pralidoxime and asoxime (HI-6) are used to restore enzyme functionality. They have greater affinity for the organic phosphate residue than the enzyme and they remove the phosphate group, restore the OH to serine and turn nitrogen from histidine back into its R_{3}N form (tertiary nitrogen). This results in full enzyme recovery and the phosphate-oxime compound is eliminated from the organism via urine. Obidoxime is more potent than pralidoxime and diacetyl-monoxime.

== Side effects ==
Oximes like these do have side effects and they include liver damage, kidney damage, nausea, vomiting, but they are very efficient antidotes to nerve gas poisoning. Usually treatment of poisoning includes the use of atropine, which can slow down the action of the poison, giving more time to apply the oxime.
