= Oxime =

Organic compounds of the form >C=N–OH

In organic chemistry, an oxime is an organic compound belonging to the imines, with the general formula RR’C=N−OH, where R is an organic side-chain and R' may be hydrogen, forming an aldoxime, or another organic group, forming a ketoxime. O-substituted oximes form a closely related family of compounds. Amidoximes are oximes of amides (R^{1}C(=O)NR^{2}R^{3}) with general structure R^{1}C(=NOH)NR^{2}R^{3}.

Oximes are usually generated by the reaction of hydroxylamine with aldehydes (R−CH=O) or ketones (RR’C=O). The term oxime dates back to the 19th century, a combination of the words oxygen and imine.

== Structure and properties ==
If the two side-chains on the central carbon are different from each other—either an aldoxime, or a ketoxime with two different "R" groups—the oxime can often have two different geometric stereoisomeric forms according to the E/Z configuration. An older terminology of syn and anti was used to identify especially aldoximes according to whether the R group was closer or further from the hydroxyl. Both forms are often stable enough to be separated from each other by standard techniques.

Oximes have three characteristic bands in the infrared spectrum, whose wavelengths corresponding to the stretching vibrations of its three types of bonds: 3600 cm^{−1} (O−H), 1665 cm^{−1} (C=N) and 945 cm^{−1} (N−O).

In aqueous solution, aliphatic oximes are 10^{2}- to 10^{3}-fold more resistant to hydrolysis than analogous hydrazones.

== Preparation ==
Oximes can be synthesized by condensation of an aldehyde or a ketone with hydroxylamine. The condensation of aldehydes with hydroxylamine gives aldoximes, and ketoximes are produced from ketones and hydroxylamine. In general, oximes exist as colorless crystals or as thick liquids and are poorly soluble in water. Therefore, oxime formation can be used for the identification of ketone or aldehyde functional groups.

Certain metal salts reduce nitro compounds to oximes.

Oximes can also be obtained from rearrangement of unstable nitroso compounds. Thus alkyl nitrites react with carbon acids to give oximes: methyl ethyl ketone with ethyl nitrite, propiophenone with methyl nitrite, and phenacyl chloride with butyl nitrite, all in ethereal hydrochloric acid. Alternatively, sodium nitrite in glacial acetic acid nitrosates ethyl acetoacetate and malononitrile.

A conceptually related reaction is the Japp–Klingemann reaction.

== Reactions ==
The hydrolysis of oximes proceeds easily by heating in the presence of various inorganic acids, and the oximes decompose into the corresponding ketones or aldehydes, and hydroxylamines. The reduction of oximes by sodium metal, sodium amalgam, hydrogenation, or reaction with hydride reagents produces amines. Typically the reduction of aldoximes gives both primary amines and secondary amines; however, reaction conditions can be altered (such as the addition of potassium hydroxide in a 1/30 molar ratio) to yield solely primary amines.

In general, oximes can be changed to the corresponding amide derivatives by treatment with various acids. This reaction is called Beckmann rearrangement. In this reaction, a hydroxyl group is exchanged with the group that is in the anti position of the hydroxyl group. The amide derivatives that are obtained by Beckmann rearrangement can be transformed into a carboxylic acid by means of hydrolysis (base or acid catalyzed). Beckmann rearrangement is used for the industrial synthesis of caprolactam (see applications below).

The Ponzio reaction (1906) concerning the conversion of m-nitrobenzaldoxime to m-nitrophenyldinitromethane using dinitrogen tetroxide was the result of research into TNT analogues:

Ponzio reaction

Gentler oxidants give mono-nitro compounds.

In the Neber rearrangement certain oximes are converted to the corresponding alpha-amino ketones.

Oximes can be dehydrated using acid anhydrides to yield corresponding nitriles.

Certain amidoximes react with benzenesulfonyl chloride to make substituted ureas in the Tiemann rearrangement:

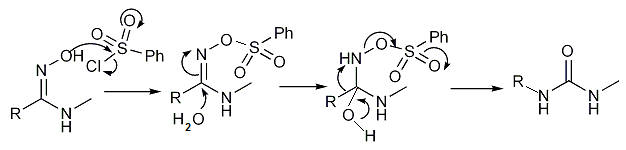

In Hudson's reaction, sulfinylation of an oxime results in N–O homolysis and recombination as the sulfonylimine:

R_{2}C=NOH + ClSOR′ → R′S(O)_{2}–N=CR_{2} + HCl

== Uses ==
In their largest application, an oxime is an intermediate in the industrial production of caprolactam, a precursor to Nylon 6. About half of the world's supply of cyclohexanone, more than a million tonnes annually, is converted to the oxime. In the presence of sulfuric acid catalyst, the oxime undergoes the Beckmann rearrangement to give the cyclic amide caprolactam:

=== Metal extractant ===
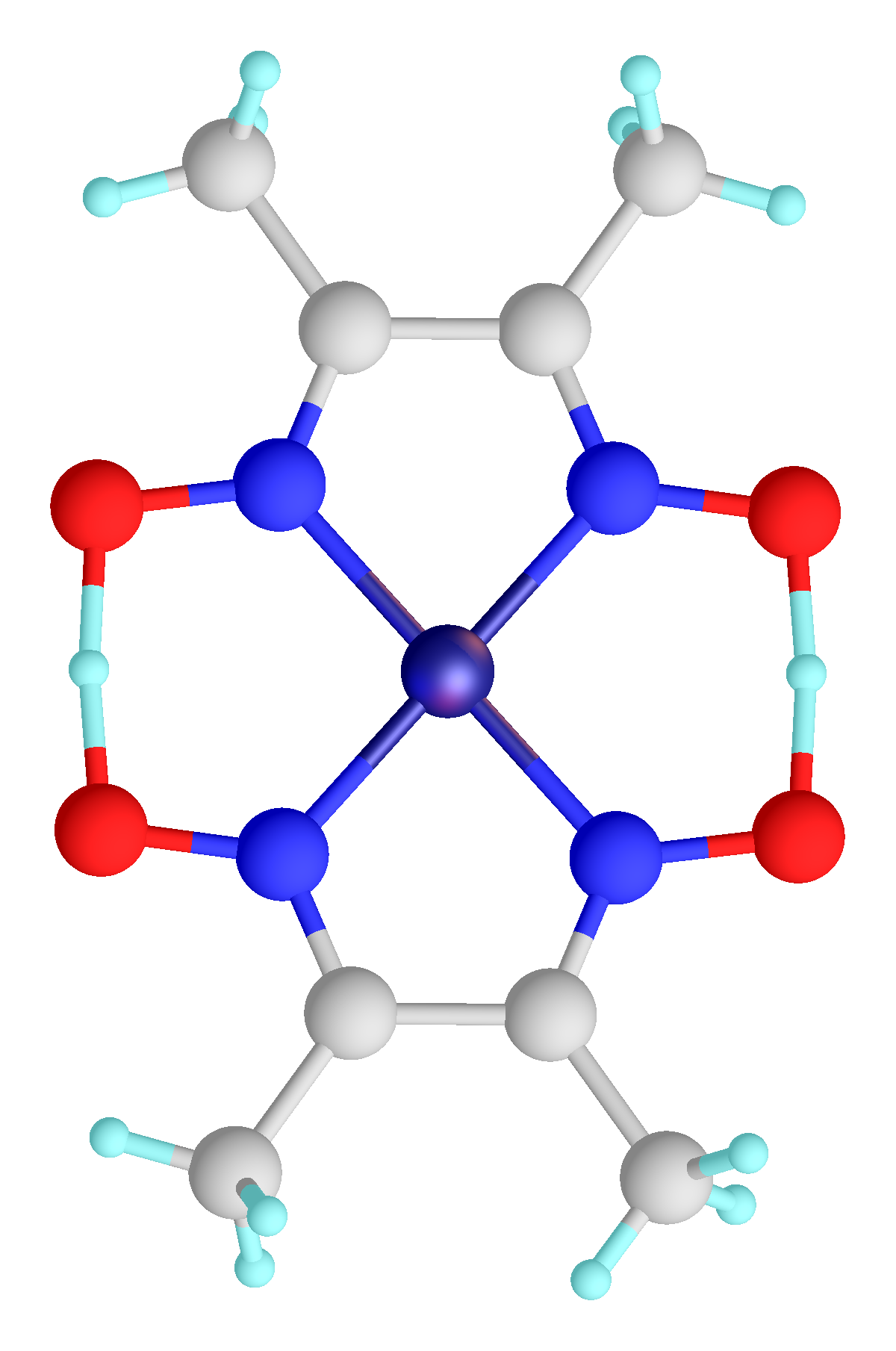
Structure of Nickel bis(dimethylglyoximate).

Oximes are commonly used as ligands and sequestering agents for metal ions. Dimethylglyoxime (dmgH_{2}) is a reagent for the analysis of nickel and a popular ligand in its own right. In the typical reaction, a metal reacts with two equivalents of dmgH_{2} concomitant with ionization of one proton. A distinctive red precipitate will form allowing for detection of nickel ions, which is fairly selective thanks to the ionic radius of nickel allowing the compact stacking of Ni(dmgH)_{2} in lattice, causing substantially more pronounced insolubility compared to complexes of dmg with other metals. Salicylaldoxime is a chelator in hydrometallurgy.

Amidoximes such as polyacrylamidoxime can be used to capture trace amounts of uranium from sea water. In 2017 researchers announced a configuration that absorbed up to nine times as much uranyl as previous fibers without saturating.

=== Other applications ===
- Oxime compounds are used as antidotes for nerve agents. A nerve agent inactivates acetylcholinesterase by phosphorylation. Oxime compounds can reactivate acetylcholinesterase by attaching to phosphorus, forming an oxime-phosphonate, which then splits away from the acetylcholinesterase molecule. Oxime nerve-agent antidotes are pralidoxime (also known as 2-PAM), obidoxime, methoxime, HI-6, Hlo-7, and TMB-4. The effectiveness of the oxime treatment depends on the particular nerve agent used.
- Perillartine, the oxime of perillaldehyde, is used as an artificial sweetener common in Japan. It is 2000 times sweeter than sucrose.
- Diaminoglyoxime is a key precursor to various compounds containing the highly reactive furazan ring.
- Methyl ethyl ketoxime is a skin-preventing additive in many oil-based paints.
- Buccoxime and 5-methyl-3-heptanone oxime ("Stemone") are perfume ingredients.
- Fluvoxamine is used as an antidepressant.

== See also ==
- Category:Oximes – specific chemicals containing this functional group
- Nitrone – the N-oxide of an imine
