= Neuropathy target esterase =

Protein-coding gene in the species Homo sapiens

PNPLA6

Identifiers
- Aliases: PNPLA6, BNHS, NTE, NTEMND, SPG39, iPLA2delta, sws, LNMS, OMCS, patatin like phospholipase domain containing 6
- External IDs: OMIM: 603197; MGI: 1354723; GeneCards: PNPLA6
Enzyme activity
| EC # | BRENDA | ExPASy | KEGG | MetaCyc |
|---|---|---|---|---|
| 3.1.1.5 | ↗ | ↗ | ↗ | ↗ |

Gene location (Human)
| Chr. | Chromosome 19 (human) |
| Band | 19p13.2 | Start | 7,534,004 bp |
| Band | 19p13.2 | End | 7,561,764 bp |

Gene location (Mouse)
| Chr. | Chromosome 8 (mouse) |
| Band | 8 A1.1|8 1.92 cM | Start | 3,565,384 bp |
| Band | 8 A1.1|8 1.92 cM | End | 3,594,267 bp |
RNA expression pattern
| Bgee | Human / Mouse (ortholog); Top expressed in: granulocyte; upper lobe of left lung; right frontal lobe; anterior pituitary; mucosa of transverse colon; right lung; right testis; spleen; left testis; apex of heart / Top expressed in: neural layer of retina; epithelium of small intestine; superior frontal gyrus; gastrula; primary visual cortex; vestibular membrane of cochlear duct; right kidney; lens; epiblast; duodenum; More reference expression data |
| BioGPS | More reference expression data |
Gene ontology
| Molecular function | hydrolase activity; lysophospholipase activity |
| Cellular component | integral component of membrane; endoplasmic reticulum; membrane; endoplasmic reticulum membrane |
| Biological process | lipid catabolic process; metabolism; phosphatidylcholine metabolic process; developmental process; lipid metabolism; glycerophospholipid catabolic process |
Sources:Amigo / QuickGO
Orthologs
| Databases | NCBI: entry; OMA: entry |
| Species | Human | Mouse |
| Entrez | 10908 | 50767 |
| Ensembl | ENSG00000032444 | ENSMUSG00000004565 |
| UniProt | Q8IY17 | Q3TRM4 |
| RefSeq (mRNA) | NM_006702; NM_001166111; NM_001166112; NM_001166113; NM_001166114 | NM_001122818; NM_015801; NM_001359121; NM_001359122; NM_001359123 NM_001359124; NM_001378951; NM_001378952; NM_001378953; NM_001378954; NM_001378955 |
| RefSeq (protein) | NP_001159583; NP_001159584; NP_001159585; NP_001159586; NP_006693 | NP_001116290; NP_056616; NP_001346050; NP_001346051; NP_001346052 NP_001346053; NP_001365880; NP_001365881; NP_001365882; NP_001365883; NP_001365884 |
| Location (UCSC) | Chr 19: 7.53 – 7.56 Mb | Chr 8: 3.57 – 3.59 Mb |
| PubMed search |
- Wikidata
| View/Edit Human | View/Edit Mouse |

Neuropathy target esterase, also known as patatin-like phospholipase domain-containing protein 6 (PNPLA6), is an esterase enzyme that in humans is encoded by the PNPLA6 gene.

Neuropathy target esterase is a phospholipase that deacetylates intracellular phosphatidylcholine to produce glycerophosphocholine. It is thought to function in neurite outgrowth and process elongation during neuronal differentiation. The protein is anchored to the cytoplasmic face of the endoplasmic reticulum in both neurons and non-neuronal cells.

== Function ==
Neuropathy target esterase is an enzyme with phospholipase B activity: it sequentially hydrolyses both fatty acids from the major membrane lipid phosphatidylcholine, generating water-soluble glycerophosphocholine. In eukaryotic cells, NTE is anchored to the cytoplasmic face of the endoplasmic reticulum membrane. In mammals, it is particularly abundant in neurons, the placenta, and the kidney. Loss of NTE activity results in abnormally-elevated levels of phosphatidylcholine in the brain and impairment of the constitutive secretory pathway in neurons.

In the kidney, the expression of neuropathy target esterase is regulated by TonEBP as part of osmolyte production when the kidney produces concentrated urine.

== Clinical significance ==
Recessively-inherited mutations in NTE that substantially reduce catalytic activity cause a rare form of hereditary spastic paraplegia (SPG39), in which distal parts of long spinal axons degenerate leading to limb weakness and paralysis. Organophosphate-induced delayed neuropathy— a paralysing syndrome with distal degeneration of long axons— results from poisoning with toxic organophosphorus compounds that irreversibly inhibit NTE.
