= Transition metal isocyanide complexes =

Class of chemical compounds

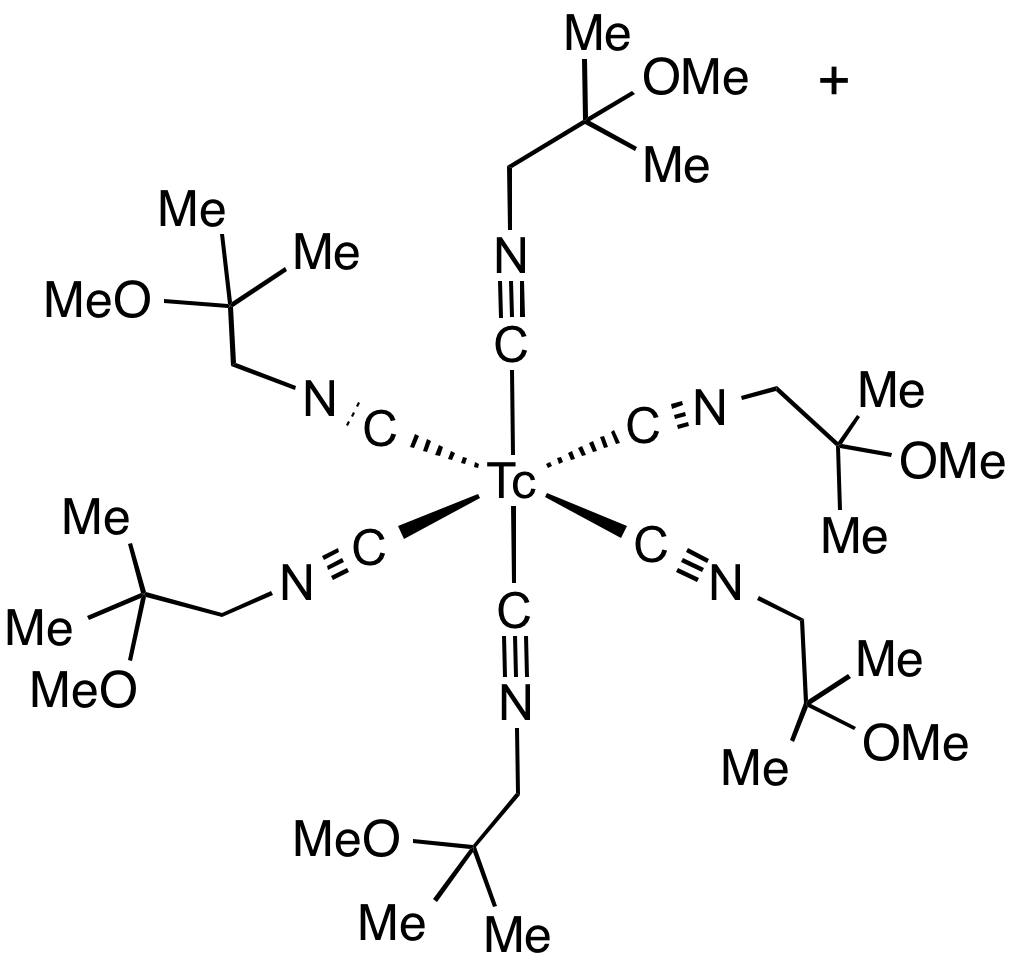
Technetium (^{99m}Tc) sestamibi is used in nuclear medicine imaging.

Transition metal isocyanide complexes are coordination compounds containing isocyanide ligands. Several thousand isocyanides are known, but the coordination chemistry is dominated by a few ligands. Common isonitrile ligands are methyl isocyanide, tert-butyl isocyanide, phenyl isocyanide, and cyclohexylisocyanide. Some isocyanide complexes are used in medical imaging.

== Ligand properties ==
According to the Covalent bond classification method, isocyanides are classified as L ligands, i.e., charge-neutral Lewis bases. With respect to HSAB theory, it is classified as soft.

Compared to CO, most isocyanides are superior Lewis bases and weaker pi-acceptors. Trifluoromethylisocyanide is the exception, its coordination properties are very similarly to those of CO. Isocyanide complexes often mirror the stoichiometry and structures of metal carbonyls. Like CO, isocyanides engage in pi-backbonding. The M-C-N angle provides some measure of the degree of backbonding. In electron-rich complexes, this angle is usually deviates from 180°. Unlike CO, cationic and dicationic complexes are common. RNC ligands are typically terminal, but bridging RNC ligands are common. Bridging isocyanides are always bent. General trends can be appreciated by inspection of the homoleptic complexes of the first row transition metals.

Because the CNC linkage is linear, the cone angle of these ligands is small, so it is easy to prepare polyisocyanide complexes. Many complexes of isocyanides show high coordination numbers, e.g. the eight-coordinate cation [Nb(CNBu−t)_{6}I_{2}]^{+}. Very bulky isocyanide ligands are also known, e.g. C_{6}H_{3}-2,6-Ar_{2}-NC (Ar =aryl).

== Di- and triisocyanide ligands ==
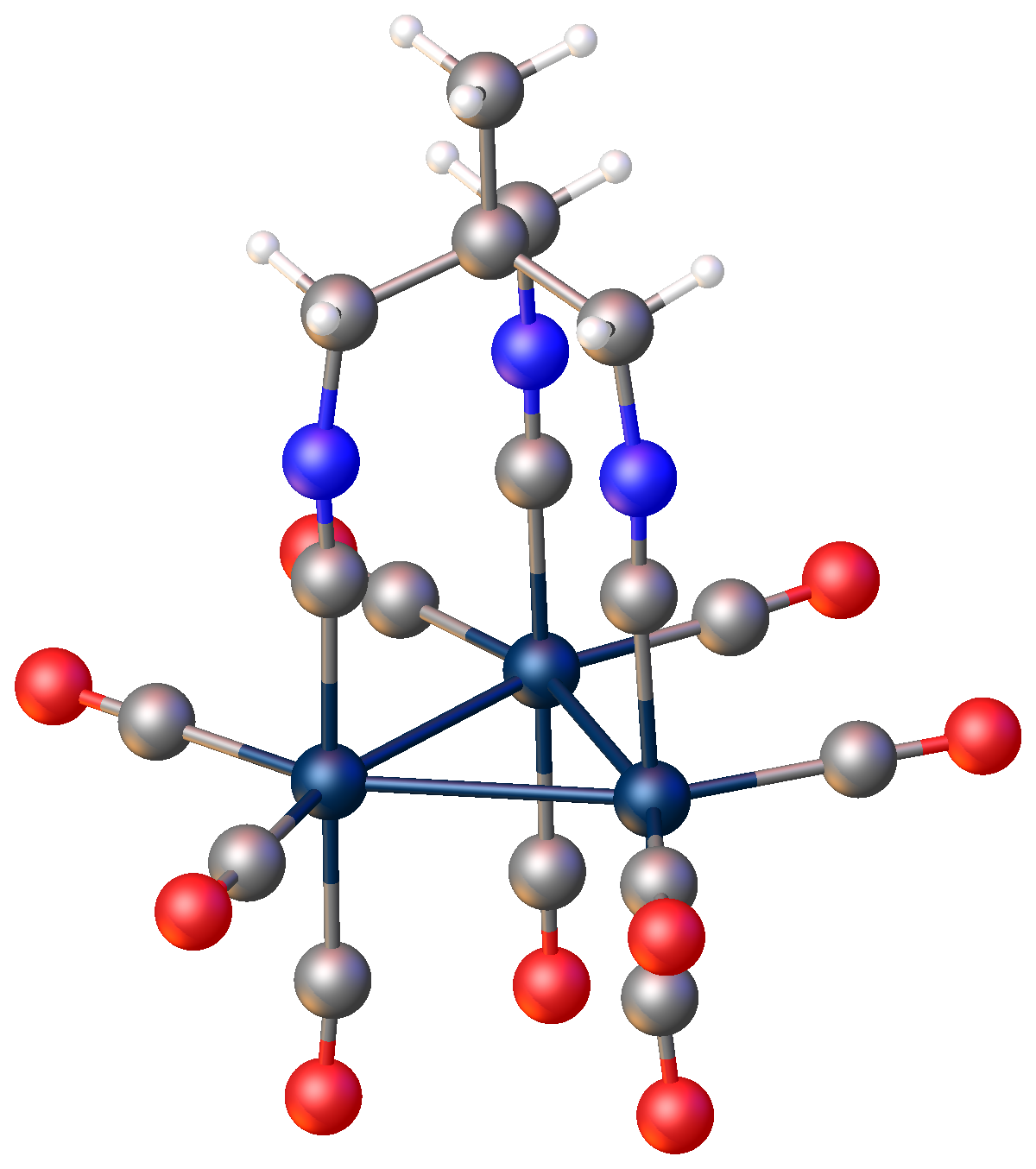
structure of Os_{3}(CO)_{9}(CNCH_{2})_{3}CMe.

Di- and triisocyanide ligands are well developed, e.g., (CH_{2})_{n}(NC)_{2}. Usually steric factors force these ligands to bind to two separate metals, i.e., they are binucleating ligands. Chelating diisocyanide ligands require elaborate backbones.

== Synthesis ==
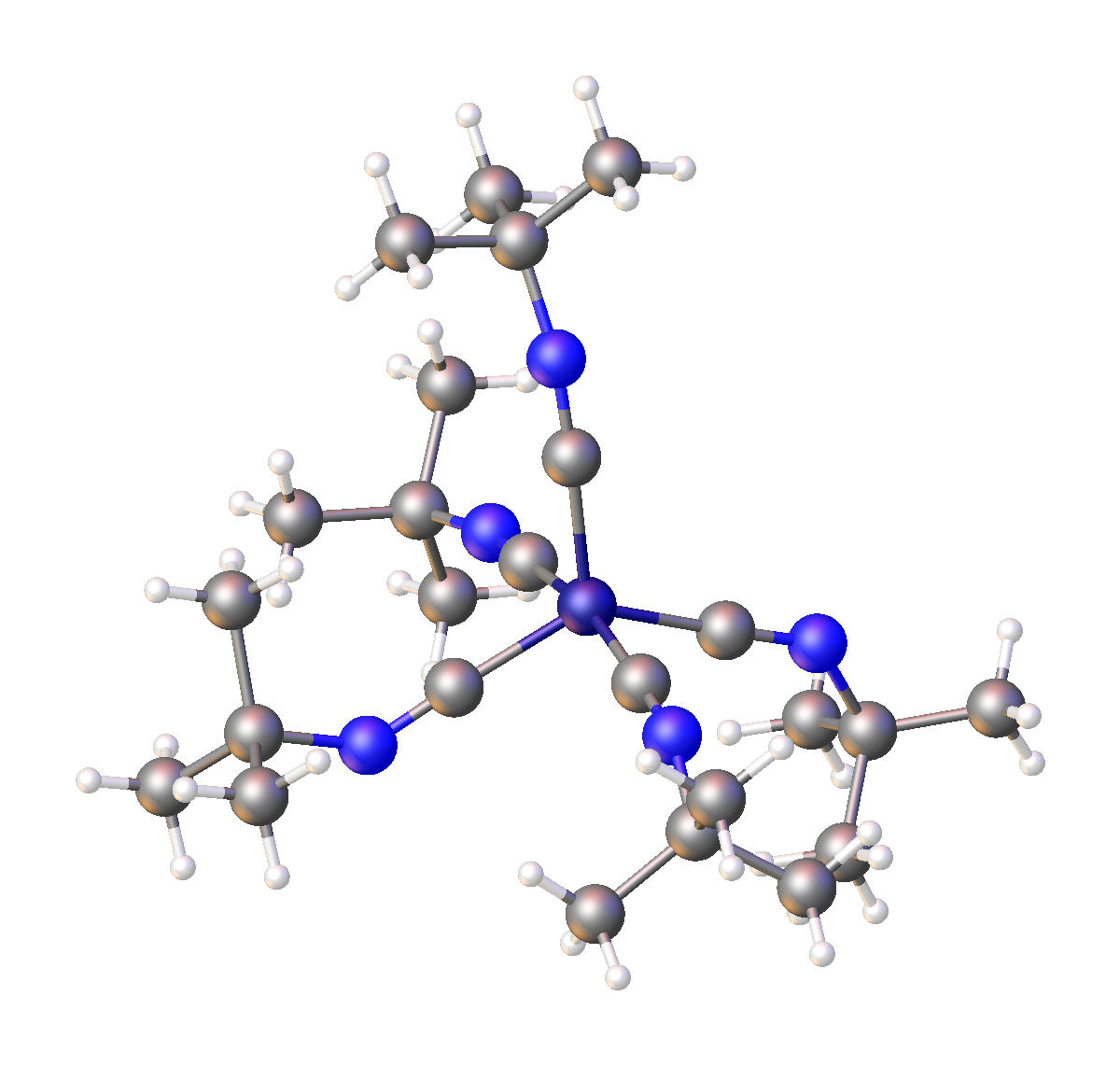
Structure of Fe(tert-BuNC)_{5}. Notice that some C-N-C angles strongly deviate from 180°, a characteristic of low-valent isocyanide complexes.

Because of their low steric profile and high basicity, isocyanide ligands often install easily, e.g. by treating metal halides with the isocyanide. Many metal cyanides can be N-alkylated to give isocyanide complexes.

== Reactions ==
The first metal carbene complex, Chugaev's red salt, was not recognized as such until decades after its preparation.

Typically, isocyanides are spectator ligands, but their reduced and oxidized complexes can prove reactive by virtue of the unsaturated nature of the ligand

Cationic isocyanide complexes are susceptible to nucleophilic attack at carbon. In this way, the first metal carbene complexes where prepared.

=== Protonation ===
Because isocyanides are more basic donors ligands than CO, their complexes are susceptible to oxidation and protonation. Thus, Fe(tBuNC)_{5} is easily protonated, whereas its counterpart Fe(CO)_{5} is not:

Fe(CNR)_{5} + H^{+} → [HFeL_{5}]^{+}
Fe(CO)_{5} + H^{+} → no reaction

Some electron-rich isocyanide complexes protonate at N to give aminocarbyne complexes:

L_{n}M-CNR + H^{+} → [L_{n}M≡CN(H)R]^{+}

Isocyanides sometimes insert into metal-alkyl bonds to form iminoacyls.

=== Redox ===
Because isocyanides are both acceptors and donors, they exhibit more reversible redox than metal carbonyls. This aspect is illustrated by the isolation of the homoleptic vanadium hexaisocyanide complex in three oxidation states, i.e., [V(CNC_{6}H_{3}-2,6-Me_{2})_{6}]^{n} for n = -1, 0, +1.

== Homoleptic complexes ==
1st Transition Series
Complex	colour	electron config.	structure	comments
[V(CNC_{6}H_{3}-2,6-Me_{2})_{6}]^{−}	green	d^{6}, 18e^{−}	octahedral	Cs^{+} salt
[V(CNC_{6}H_{3}-2,6-Me_{2})_{6}]^{0}	purple	d^{5}	octahedral	
[V(CNC_{6}H_{3}-2,6-Me_{2})_{6}]^{+}	red	d^{4}	octahedral	PF_{6}^{−} salt
[V(CNC_{6}H_{3}-2,6-Me_{2})_{7}]^{+}	red	d^{4}, 18e^{−}	monocapped trigonal prism	iodide salt
[Cr(CNPh)_{6}]^{3+}	orange	d^{3}	octahedral	
[Cr(CN-t-Bu)_{7}]^{2+}	orange	d^{4}, 18e^{−}	octahedral	
[Cr(CNPh)_{6}]^{0}, 18e^{−}		d^{6}	octahedral	many analogues
[Cr(CNMe)_{6}]^{+}OTf^{−}	yellow-brown	d^{5}	octahedral	
[Mn(CNPh)_{6}]^{+}	yellow	d^{6}, 18e^{−}	octahedral	
[Fe(CNMe)_{5}]^{0}	colourless	d^{8}, 18e^{−}	trigonal bipyramidal	
[Fe_{2}(CNEt)_{9}]^{0}	yellow	d^{8}	confacial bioctahedral	see Fe_{2}(CO)_{9}
[Fe(CNMe)_{6}]^{2+}	colourless	d^{6}, 18e^{−}	octahedral	
[Co_{2}(CN-t-Bu)_{8}]^{0}	red-orange	d^{9}	pentacoordinated with bridging isocyanides	see Co_{2}(CO)_{8}
[Co(CN-t-Bu)_{5}]^{+}	yellow	d^{8}, 18e^{−}	trigonal bipyramidal	
[Co(CNC_{6}H_{3}-2,6-Me_{2})_{4}]^{−}	red	d^{6}, 18e^{−}	tetrahedral	see Co(CO)_{4}^{−}
[Ni(CNMe)_{4}]^{0}	colourless	d^{10}, 18e^{−}	tetrahedral	see Ni(CO)_{4}
[Ni(CNC_{6}H_{3}-2,6-iPr_{2})_{4}]^{2+}	yellow	d^{8}	square planar	see [Ni(CN)_{4}]^{2-}
[Ni_{4}(CN-t-Bu)_{7}]^{0}	red	d^{10}	cluster	
[Cu(CNMe)_{4}]^{+}	colourless	d^{10}, 18e^{−}	tetrahedral	analogous [Cu(CO)_{4}]^{+} is unknown

== IR spectroscopy ==
The ν_{C≡N} band in isocyanides is intense in the range of 2165–2110 cm^{−1}. The value of ν_{C≡N} is diagnostic of the electronic character of the complex. In complexes where RNC is primarily a sigma donor ligand, ν_{C≡N} shifts to higher energies vs free isocyanide. Thus, for [Co(CN−t−Bu)_{5}]^{+}, ν_{C≡N} = 2152, 2120 cm^{−l}. In contrast, for the electron-rich species Fe_{2}(CNEt)_{9}, ν_{C≡N} = 2060, 1920 cm^{−l} for the terminal isocyanide ligands (1701, 1652 cm^{−l} for the bridging isocyanides).

== See also ==
- Cyanometalate - coordination compounds containing cyanide ligands (coordinating via C)
- Transition metal nitrile complexes - coordination compounds containing nitrile ligands, which are isomers of isonitriles
