= Ugi =

Ugi or UGI may refer to:

- Ugi reaction, in chemistry
- UGI Corporation, an American energy company
- Ugi Island in the Solomon Islands
- Camillo Ugi (1884–1970), German footballer
- Ivar Karl Ugi (1930–2005), German chemist

== See also ==
- Uggi (disambiguation)
- Ugie (disambiguation)
