= Aspergillus cejpii =

Scientific classification
- Kingdom: Fungi
- Division: Ascomycota
- Class: Eurotiomycetes
- Order: Eurotiales
- Family: Aspergillaceae
- Genus: Aspergillus
- Species: A. cejpii

Binomial name
- Aspergillus cejpii (Milko) Samson, Varga, Visagie & Houbraken 2014

Type strain
- CBS 157.66

Synonyms
- Dichotomomyces cejpii, Talaromyces cejpii

Species of fungus

Aspergillus cejpii is a species of fungus in the genus Aspergillus. It is from the Clavati section. The species was first described in 1975. Aspergillus cejpii produces gliotoxin, acetylgliotoxin G, fiscalin B and xanthocillin X.

== Growth and morphology ==
A. cejpii has been cultivated on both Czapek yeast extract agar (CYA) plates and Malt Extract Agar Oxoid® (MEAOX) plates. The growth morphology of the colonies can be seen in the pictures below.

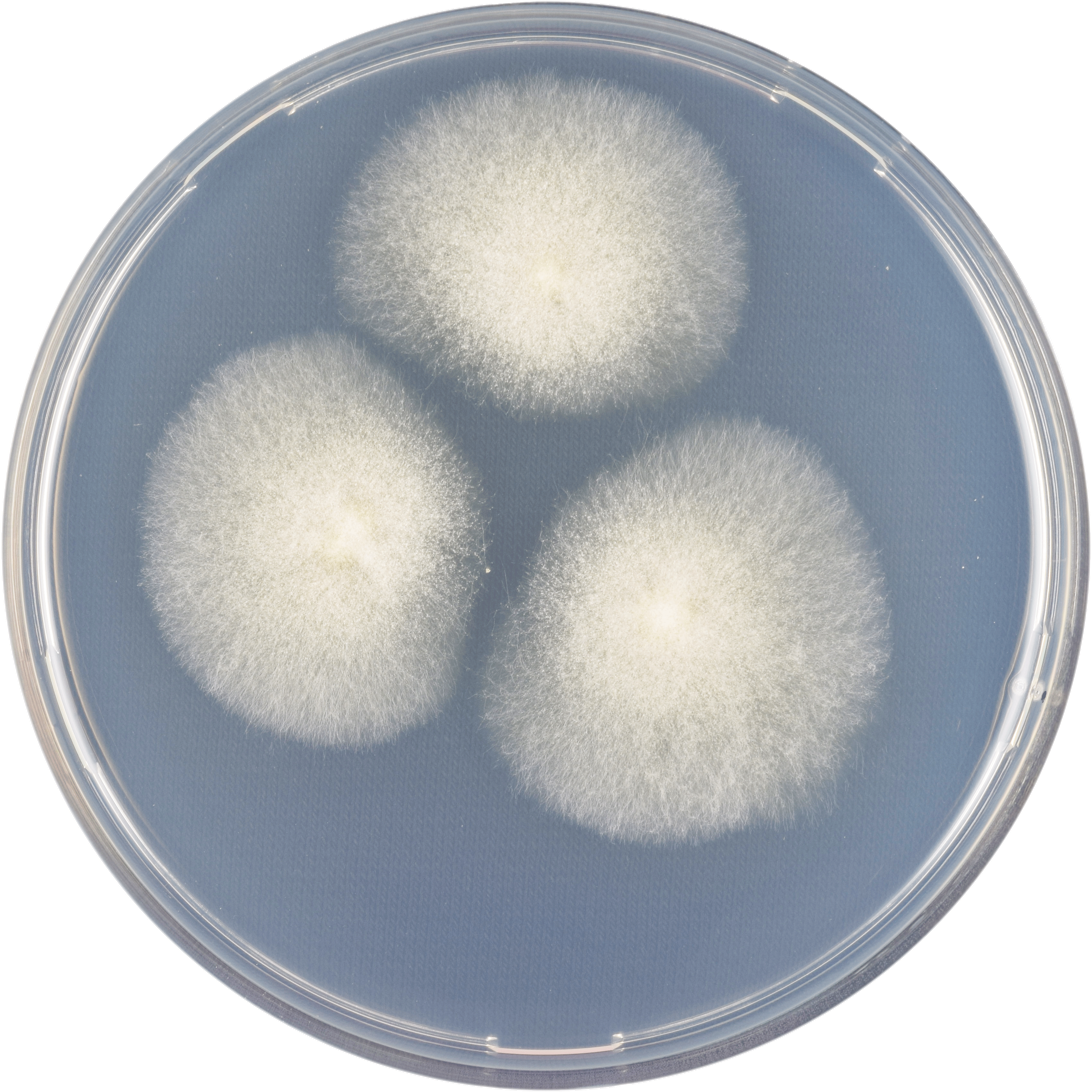
Aspergillus cejpii growing on CYA plate

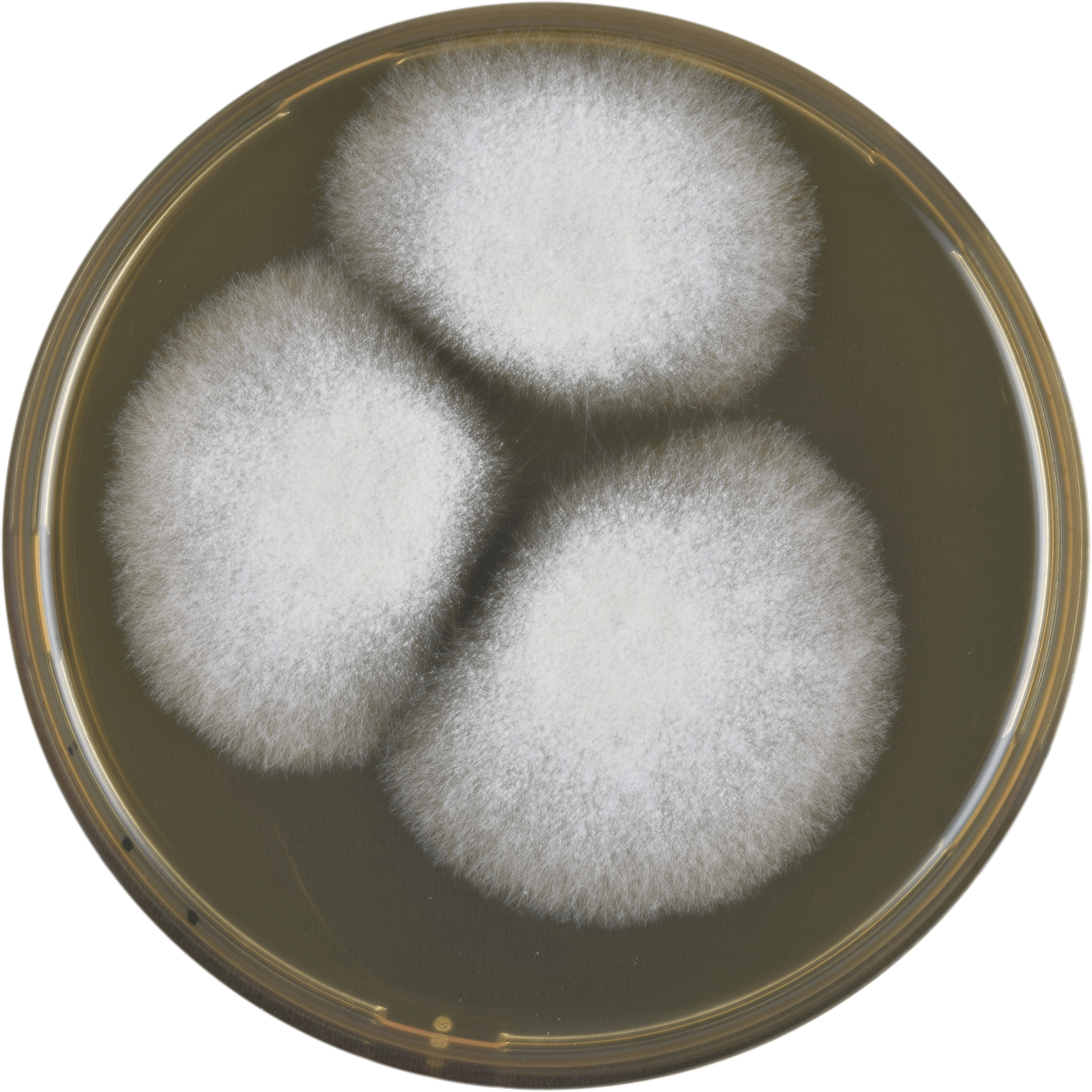
Aspergillus cejpii growing on MEAOX plate
