= Azinger =

Azinger is a surname of German origin. Notable people with the surname include:

- Mike Azinger (born 1965), American politician
- Paul Azinger (born 1960), American golfer and TV analyst
- Tom Azinger (1935–2024), American politician

== See also ==
- Asinger
