= Ilse Hagedorn =

German chemist

- Born: May 17, 1921; Dresden, Weimar Republic
- Died: December 17, 2005 (aged 84); Freiburg, Germany
- Education: TU Dresden, University of Freiburg
- Known for: Discovery of Asoxime chloride, used in treating organophosphate poisoning
- Scientific career
- Fields: Organic Chemistry, Toxicology, Pharmacology
- Workplaces: University of Freiburg; TU Dresden; Arzneimittelwerk Dresden
- Thesis: Elucidation of the constitution of xanthocillin by hydrolytic and oxidative degradation (1956)
- Doctoral advisor: Prof. Walther König
- Doctoral students: Klaus Schoene

Ilse Hagedorn (17 May 1921 – 17 December 2005) was a German chemist known for her work on antidotes for organophosphate poisoning. She led the development of the Hagedorn oximes, a series of bispyridinium oximes including HI-6 and HLö-7, which are effective reactivators of acetylcholinesterase inhibited by nerve agents and organophosphorus pesticides.

== Early life and education ==
Hagedorn was born on 17 May 1921 in Dresden, Germany. She began studying chemistry at TU Dresden in 1940. Her studies were interrupted by the destruction of Dresden during World War II; she took shelter in a village in the Erzgebirge region and supported herself through farming and selling domestic appliances.

She resumed her studies in 1948, earning a diploma on 19 February 1951 on “Halochromic effects in pentamethine dyes” under Prof. Walter König at the Institute of Farbenchemie. She worked briefly at Arzneimittelwerk Dresden, researching glycosides and alkaloids, before refusing to join the ruling Socialist Unity Party (SED), which led to her leaving the position.

Hagedorn completed her PhD on 12 October 1956 with a dissertation on “Elucidation of the constitution of xanthocillin by hydrolytic and oxidative degradation”, which she published 1956 and 1957. She pursued a second dissertation on the total synthesis of xanthocillin dimethyl ether, which she completed in 1962, preparing the foundation for her subsequent work on organophosphate antidotes.

== Research career ==
In 1958, Hagedorn joined the Chemical Laboratory of the University of Freiburg under Prof. Arthur Lüttringhaus. She initially worked on the synthesis of isonitriles and xanthocillin derivatives. During this period, she became involved in research on acetylcholinesterase reactivators to treat organophosphate poisoning, a project that began as part of Cold War-era defense research.

Hagedorn collaborated with Lüttringhaus and PhD student Klaus Schoene to develop bis-pyridinium oximes. She synthesized hundreds of oximes, including:

- LüH 6: Named after Lüttringhaus and Hagedorn; an early acetylcholinesterase reactivator.
- HS series: Named after Schoene, including HS 6, the first prominent asymmetrical bispyridinium oxime active against soman.
- HI series: Developed with Irmo Stark; HI-6 demonstrated high efficacy against nerve agents such as sarin, cyclosarin, and soman.
- HLö-7: Broad-spectrum oxime highly effective against nerve agents and organophosphorus pesticides, named in part after Marlies Löffler.

Her work included both chemical synthesis and mechanistic studies, including pKa optimization for oxime reactivity and investigation of bisquaternary pyridinium compounds’ reactivation mechanisms. HI-6 was later fielded in military applications such as the second Gulf War.

Hagedorn was known for mentoring her students closely and for her insistence that doctoral theses be completed before publishing new results. Over her career, her laboratory synthesized more than 1,000 oximes and related compounds.

== Later life and legacy publications ==
Hagedorn retired in 1985 but continued to follow the development of Hagedorn oximes and their licensing for military and medical use. She died on 17 December 2005 in Freiburg, Germany. Her contributions are widely recognized in the fields of pharmacology and toxicology. The Hagedorn oximes remain a cornerstone in the treatment of organophosphate poisoning and continue to influence antidote development worldwide.

== Publications ==
According to the Scopus database circa November 30, 2025, Ilse Hagerdor's Scopus ID is 6602250508. She authored 27 publications that have been cited 754 times, and her Hirsch index is 16.

- Hagedorn, I; Tonjes, H (1956). "Structure of xanthocillin, a new antibiotic". Die Pharmazie. 11 (6): 409–410. PMID 13370319.
- Hagedorn, I; Tonjes, H (1956). "Structural explanation of xanthocillin; a new antibiotic". Die Pharmazie. 12 (9): 567–580. PMID 13494165.
- Giesselmann, G; Hagedorn, I (1960). "ikroanalytische Bestimmung von Chlor (Brom) und Schwefel in organischen Verbindungen in einer Einwaage". Mikrochimica Acta. 48. Springer: 390–393. doi:10.1007/BF01218978.
- Hagedorn, I; Lüttringhaus, A (1960). "Beiträge zur Konstitutionsermittlung des Antibiotikums Xanthocillin". Chemische Berichte. 93 (7). Chemistry Europe: 1584–1590. doi:10.1002/cber.19600930720.
- Hagedorn, I; Lüttringhaus, A (1964). "QUATERNARY HYDROXYIMINOMETHYLPYRIDINIUM SALTS. THE DISCHLORIDE OF BIS-(4-HYDROXYIMINOMETHYL-1-PYRIDINIUM-METHYL)-ETHER (LUEH6), A NEW REACTIVATOR OF ACETYLCHOLINESTERASE INHIBITED BY ORGANIC PHOSPHORIC ACID ESTERS". Arzneimittel-Forschung. 14: 1–5. PMID 14223684.
- Hagedorn, I; Eholzer, U (1965). "QIsonitrile, VII. Einstufige Synthese von α‐Hydroxysäure‐amiden durch Abwandlung der Passerini‐Reaktion". Chemische Berichte. 98 (3). Chemistry-Europe: 936–940. doi:10.1002/cber.19650980337.
- Hagedorn, I; Eholzer, U (1965). "Isonitrile, VI. Dehydro‐Dimerisierung von ω‐Acylamino‐acetophenonen. Beitrag zur Totalsynthese des Xanthocillin‐dimethyläthers". Chemische Berichte. 98 (1). Chemistry-Europe: 202–207. doi:10.1002/cber.19650980126.
- Hagedorn, I; Eholzer, U (1965). "Isonitrile, V. Darstellung von α.β‐ungesättigten Isonitrilen, β‐Keto‐ und β‐Chlor‐isonitrilen. Synthese des Xanthocillin‐dimethyläthers". Chemische Berichte. 98 (1). Chemistry-Europe: 193–201. doi:10.1002/cber.19650980125.
- Hagedorn, I; Etling, H (1966). "Isonitrile, VIII. Darstellung von N.N′‐Bis‐arylsulfonyl‐formamidinen". Chemische Berichte. 99 (2). Chemistry-Europe: 520–523. doi:10.1002/cber.19660990220.
- Hagedorn, I; Lichtel, K. E. (1966). "Darstellung von Tetrakis‐[N‐alkyl‐anilino]‐äthylenen". Chemische Berichte. 99 (2). Chemistry-Europe: 524–526. doi:10.1002/cber.19660990221.
- Hagedorn, I; Winkelman, H. D. (1966). "1‐Amino‐tetrazol". Chemische Berichte. 99 (3). Chemistry-Europe: 850–855. doi:10.1002/cber.19660990317.
- Hagedorn, I., Gündel, W. H. & Schoene, K. Reactivation of phosphorylated acetylcholine esterase with oximes: contribution to the study of the reaction course. Arzneimittel-Forschung/Drug Research 19, 603-606 (1969).
- Hagedorn, I., Stark, I. & Lorenz, H. P. Reactivation of Phosphorylated Acetylcholinesterase—Dependence upon Activator Acidity. Angewandte Chemie International Edition in English 11, 307-309 (1972). https://doi.org/10.1002/anie.197203071
- Gündel, W. H. & Hagedorn, I. Untersuchungen an Pyridiniumsalzen, I. Disproportionierung von verbrückten Nicotinsäureamid‐Salzen. Justus Liebigs Annalen der Chemie 1973, 1237-1240 (1973). https://doi.org/10.1002/jlac.197319730802
- Gündel, W. H., Buecher, B. & Hagedorn, I. Reaktionen von quaterniertem Nikotinsäureamid mit starker Base. Zeitschrift fur Naturforschung - Section B Journal of Chemical Sciences 29, 556-560 (1974). https://doi.org/10.1515/znb-1974-7-821
- Hagedorn, I. & Hohler, W. Vinylogous Pyridinecarbaldehydes by Wittig Reaction. Angewandte Chemie International Edition in English 14, 486-486 (1975). https://doi.org/10.1002/anie.197504861
- Hagedorn, I. & Guendel, W. H. Betaines of quaternary salts of pyridine 2 and 4 aldoxim. Arzneimittel-Forschung/Drug Research 26, 753-755 (1976).
- Hagedorn, I., Guendel, W. H. & Hoose, J. Synthesis and quaternation of pyridine aldoxim alkylethers. Arzneimittel-Forschung/Drug Research 26, 1273-1275 (1976).
- Hagedorn, I. & Hohler, W. Reactivation of phosphorylated acetylcholinesterase (AChE): quaternary salts of vinylogous pyridinaldoximes. Arzneimittel-Forschung/Drug Research 26, 1515-1517 (1976).
- Hagedorn, I., Stark, I., Schoene, K. & Schenkel, H. Reactivation of phosphorylated acetylcholinesterase. Isomeric bisquaternary salts of pyridine aldoximes. Arzneimittel-Forschung/Drug Research 28, 2055-2057 (1978).
- Kuhnen-Clausen, D., Hagedorn, I. & Bill, R. Synthesis of Pyridinium Analogs of Acetylcholine and Their Interactions with Intestinal Muscarinic Receptors. Journal of Medicinal Chemistry 22, 177-180 (1979). https://doi.org/10.1021/jm00188a010
- Kuhnen-Clausen, D., Hagedorn, I., Gross, G., Bayer, H. & Hucho, F. Interactions of bisquaternary pyridine salts (H-Oximes) with cholinergic receptors. Archives of Toxicology 54, 171-179 (1983). https://doi.org/10.1007/BF01239201
- Brown, N. D., Richard Gray, R., Stermer-Cox, M. G., Doctor, B. P. & Hagedorn, I. Stability study of HI-6 dichloride in various anticholinergic formulations. Journal of Chromatography A 315, 389-394 (1984). https://doi.org/10.1016/S0021-9673(01)90757-5
- Brown, N. D., Kazyak, L., Doctor, B. P. & Hagedorn, I. Separation and identification of substituted pyridine analogues in heat labile solutions of HI-6 dichloride. Journal of Chromatography A 351, 599-603 (1986). https://doi.org/10.1016/S0021-9673(01)83546-9
- Eyer, P., Hagedorn, I. & Ladstetter, B. Study on the stability of the oxime HI 6 in aqueous solution. Archives of Toxicology 62, 224-226 (1988). https://doi.org/10.1007/BF00570145
- de Jong, L. P. A., Verhagen, M. A. A., Langenberg, J. P., Hagedorn, I. & Löffler, M. The bispyridinium-dioxime HLö-7. A potent reactivator for acetylcholinesterase inhibited by the stereoisomers of tabun and soman. Biochemical Pharmacology 38, 633-640 (1989). https://doi.org/10.1016/0006-2952(89)90209-8
- Eyer, P. et al. HLö 7 dimethanesulfonate, a potent bispyridinium-dioxime against anticholinesterases. Archives of Toxicology 66, 603-621 (1992). https://doi.org/10.1007/BF01981499
