= Ugie =

Ugie or UGIE may refer to:

- Ugie, Eastern Cape, a town in South Africa
- River Ugie, a river in Scotland
- Ugie Hospital, a hospital in Scotland
- Upper gastrointestinal endoscopy, a medical procedure
- Utkalmani Gopabandhu Institute of Engineering, a college in India
- Ugie Urbina, Venezuelan basketball player

== See also ==
- Uggie, a dog
- Ugi (disambiguation)
