= Ivar Karl Ugi =

Estonian-German chemist (1930–2005)

Ivar Ugi
- Born: 9 September 1930; Kuressaare, Saaremaa, Estonia
- Died: 29 September 2005 (aged 75); Munich, Germany
- Education: University of Tübingen; Ludwig-Maximilians-Universität München
- Known for: Ugi reaction
- Scientific career
- Fields: Chemist
- Workplaces: Ludwig-Maximilians-Universität München; Bayer; Univ. Southern Calif. Technical University of Munich
- Doctoral advisor: Rolf Huisgen

Ivar Karl Ugi (9 September 1930 in Saaremaa, Estonia – 29 September 2005 in Munich) was an Estonian-born German chemist who made major contributions to organic chemistry. He is known for the research on multicomponent reactions, yielding the Ugi reaction.

== Biography ==
After he went to Germany from Estonia in 1941, he began his studies of chemistry in 1949 at the University of Tübingen until 1951. He became Dr. rer. nat. in 1954 at the Ludwig-Maximilians-Universität München. He did his habilitation 1960 at the same university. After a short but very successful career in industry at Bayer from 1962 until 1968 when he joined the University of Southern California at Los Angeles.

From 1971, he worked at the Technical University of Munich, and was an emeritus from 1999 until his death in 2005.

== Research and development ==
The one pot reaction of a ketone or aldehyde, an amine, an isocyanide and a carboxylic acid to form a bis-amide is generally known as Ugi reaction.

== Major works ==
- Ugi, I. (1962). "The α-Addition of Immonium Ions and Anions to Isonitriles Accompanied by Secondary Reactions". Angew. Chem. Int. Ed. Engl. 1 (1): 8–21. doi:10.1002/anie.196200081.
