= Friedrich Asinger =

Austrian chemist and professor

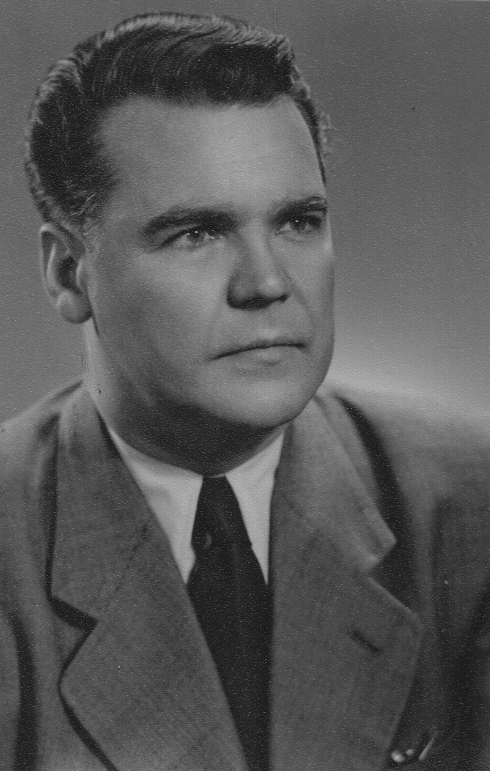
- Born: 26 June 1907; Freiland/Niederdonau, Austria
- Died: 7 March 1999 (aged 91); Aachen, Germany
- Education: Vienna University of Technology, PhD
- Occupations: chemist, professor
- Known for: Asinger reaction

Friedrich Asinger (26 June 1907 in Freiland/Niederdonau (Austria); – 7 March 1999 in Aachen) was an Austrian chemist and professor for Technical Chemistry. He is well known for his development of a multi-component reaction, the Asinger reaction for the synthesis of 3-thiazolines.

== Life and work ==
Asinger grew up with an older brother and two sisters in Lower Austria, as son of the head of a paper and cardboard factory. His mother came from a family of innkeepers. He graduated in 1924 from the upper secondary school in Krems an der Donau at the age of 17. He studied chemistry at the Vienna University of Technology, where he became in 1932 an academic student of Friedrich Böck (1876–1958). He successfully defended his PhD thesis on "Über den Einfluß von Substituenten auf die Verseifungsgeschwindigkeit von Benzalchlorid (The Influence of substituents on the saponification rate of benzal chloride)" and graduated with distinction.

Asinger spent several years as department head in different companies in the chemical industry. He worked with the company Koreska, a factory for the production of chemically prepared paper, as a chemist at the Vacuum Oil Company in Vienna, and since 1 May 1937 as a research chemist in the Central Testing Laboratory of the ammonia plants in Leuna GmbH Merseburg. In 1943 he obtained his Habilitation at the University of Graz. He became first lecturer at the University of Halle-Wittenberg on 23 February 1944. He took several positions in university and industrial research, in example he was an honorary lecturer at the University of Halle-Wittenberg where Karl Ziegler was the department head.

Because of his membership in the NSDAP, where he was a member since 1933 he was discharged in December 1945 as an honorary lecturer. His efforts to reverse his dismissal, despite written support from the Leuna plant – also with reference to the benevolence of his Russian superiors – and supporting letters from various social organizations, were without success.

In October 1946, Asinger was deported together with 34 chemists, physicists and engineers of the Leuna-Werke to the Soviet Union to Dzerzhinsk, near Gorky. Asinger worked as group leader in the development of rocket propellants. From 1951 on he worked in Rubezhnoe now Luhansk Oblast. During the eight years of his deportation, he observed that the reaction of ketones or aldehydes, Sulfur or hydrogen sulphide together with ammonia or amines led to various nitrogen- and sulfur-containing heterocycles. In his spare time Asinger began to write on the monographs Chemie und Technologie der Paraffine (Chemistry and Technology of paraffins) and Chemie und Technologie der Monoolefine (Chemistry and Technology of monoolefins), which were published later in 1956 and 1957 in the Akademie-Verlag, East Berlin. In 1954 he returned to East Germany three years later than most of the other scientists of the Leuna works. He worked at Leuna and at the same time as Honorary Professor in Halle-Wittenberg. In 1957 he was appointed as Chair of Organic Chemistry at the Martin-Luther-University in Halle, Saxony-Anhalt and later at the Dresden University of Technology. Asinger encouraged H. G. O. Becker and other senior assistants to write the Organikum, a workbook for the basic training in organic chemistry which is popular to this day (total circulation: nearly 400 000). The book was written as an obligation on the occasion of the 10th Anniversary of the founding of East Germany.

In 1959 he left East Germany as a citizen of Austria and took a position at the RWTH Aachen, where he became head of the Institute for Technical Chemistry and Petrochemistry.

Structure of D-penicillamine

In his years of academic research he further developed the chemistry of nitrogen-sulfur heterocycles, so that this chemistry is also known as Asinger chemistry. A milestone of this chemistry is the Total synthesis of D-penicillamine in a thirteen-step synthesis, starting from isobutyraldehyde, ammonia and sulfur. He published 118 papers on this topic.

In 1972 Asinger retired in Aachen.

Well-known students of Asinger are in example Heribert Offermanns, a longtime board member of the Degussa AG, Egon Fanghänel, professor of organic chemistry at the Technical University Merseburg and then at the University of Halle-Wittenberg, and Karl Gewald, who is best known for the development of the Gewald reaction and his work in the field of thiophenes and heterocycles.

== Honors ==
- 1990 honorary doctorate of the Faculty of Science, Technical University "Carl Schorlemmer" Leuna-Merseburg
- Order of Merit of the Federal Republic of Germany first class
- Baron Auer von Welsbach Medal of the Austrian Chemical Society
- Hans Hoefer-Medal of the ÖGEW (Austrian Society for Petroleum Sciences)
- Honorary Doctorate of the Johannes Kepler University Linz
- Member of the Akademie der Wissenschaften zu Berlin

== Publications ==
- Lorenz, L. (21 October 1961). "Chemie und Technologie der Monoolefine, von F. Asinger. Akademie- Verlag, Berlin 1957. 1. Aufl., XXIV, 973 S., 460 Tab., 144 Abb., geb. D M 67. —". Angewandte Chemie (in German). 73 (20). Wiley: 687–687. doi:10.1002/ange.19610732012. ISSN 0044-8249.
- Lorenz, L. (7 April 1957). "Chemie und Technologie der Paraffin-Kohlenwasserstoffe, von F. Asinger. Akademie-Verlag, Berlin 1956. 1. Aufl. XXIV, 719 S., 108 Abb., 192 Tab., geb. DM 42. —". Angewandte Chemie (in German). 69 (7). Wiley: 243–244. doi:10.1002/ange.19570690719. ISSN 0044-8249.
- Einführung in die Petrolchemie. Akademie-Verlag, Berlin 1959.

== Literature ==
- Keim, Wilhelm; Offermanns, Heribert (13 August 2007). "Friedrich Asinger (1907–1999): A Mediator between Basic and Applied Research". Angewandte Chemie International Edition. 46 (32). Wiley: 6010–6013. doi:10.1002/anie.200700904. ISSN 1433-7851. PMID 17563914.
