= Uggi =

Uggi may refer to:

- Oghi, Pakistan, a town and tehsil in Pakistan
- Uggi, Jalandhar, a village in India

== See also ==
- Uggie, a dog actor
- Ugi (disambiguation)
