= Heribert Offermanns =

German chemist (1937–2025)

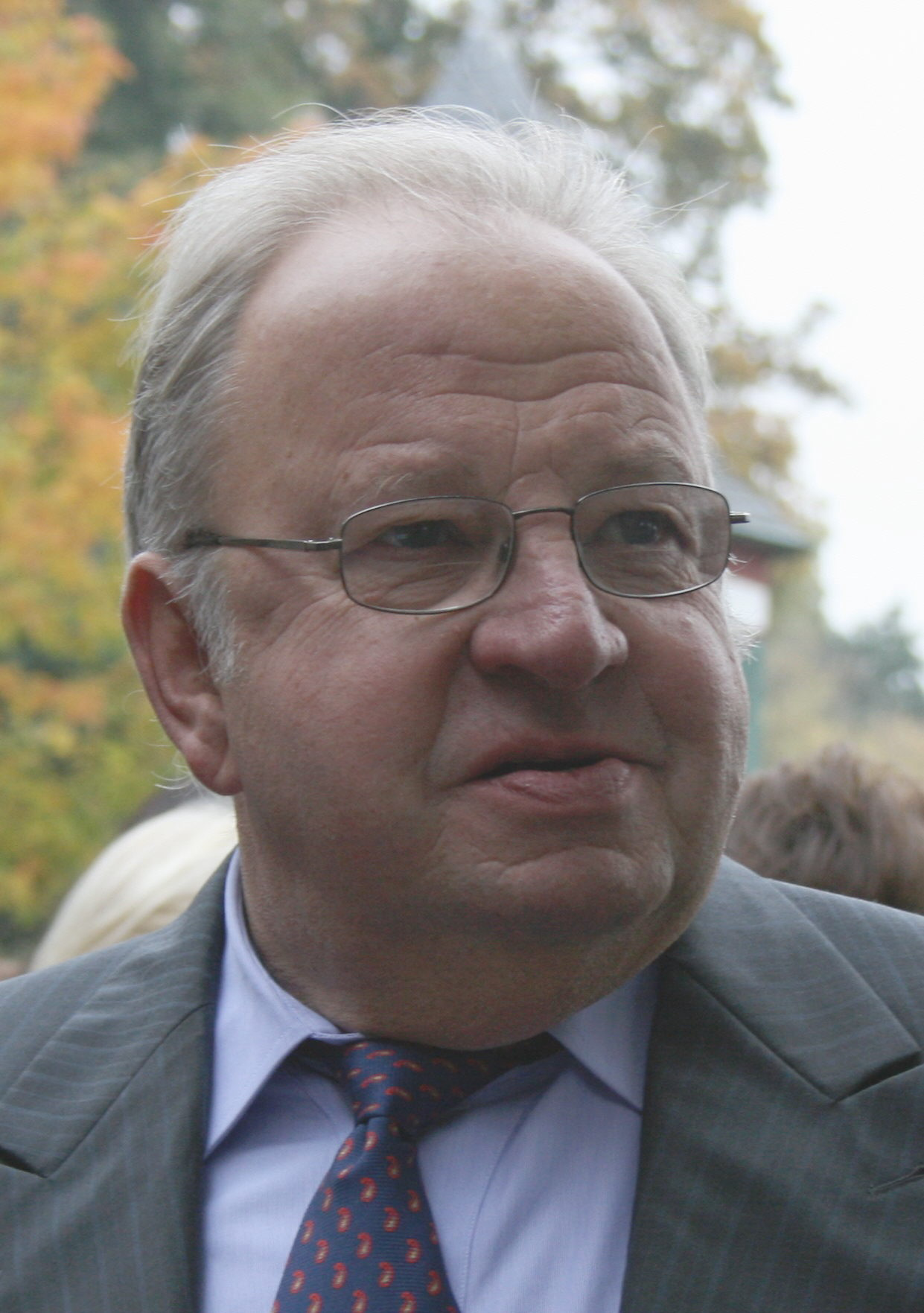
Offermanns in 2008

Heribert Offermanns (24 October 1937 – 24 November 2025) was a German chemist who was a member of the board of the Degussa AG.

== Life and career ==
Offermanns was born in Merkstein on 24 October 1937. He studied chemistry at the Rheinisch-Westfälische Technische Hochschule Aachen (RWTH Aachen). He worked on his doctoral thesis as assistant to Friedrich Asinger on the border between organic and technical chemistry. After receiving his doctorate, he worked afterwards on industrial chemistry and pharmaceutical research at the Degussa AG and at Degussa Antwerpen NV and Degussa Inc., New York. In 1976, Offermanns was appointed member of the management board of Degussa AG with the responsibility for research and development. Offermanns remained a member of the board until 2000. He managed the development and expansion of Degussa's research center in Hanau-Wolfgang. He died in Hanau on 24 November 2025, at the age of 88.

== Honours ==
Offermanns was the president of the German Chemical Society and a member of the Senate of the German Research Foundation (DFG). He was also a member of the board of Johann Wolfgang Goethe-University in Frankfurt and the University of Regensburg.

Offermanns was board member of the Paul Ehrlich Foundation and chairman of the board of trustees of the Max-Planck-Institute for Solid State Research, Stuttgart. Since 1988, he was Honorary Professor at the Johann Wolfgang Goethe University in Frankfurt. Heribert Offermanns has published numerous scientific papers on sulfur chemistry and on the production and use of hydrogen peroxide, he held also several patents.

== Awards ==
- Heribert Offermanns received an honorary doctorate in engineering at the RWTH Aachen
- 1997: Carl Duisberg Medal of the German Chemical Society
- 2001: Karl Winnacker Prize of the University of Marburg
- 2011: Officer's Cross of the Order of Merit of the Federal Republic of Germany

== Publications ==
- Offermanns, Heribert (2011). "Azalogie-Prinzip: hin und zurück". Nachrichten aus der Chemie (in German). 59 (12). Wiley: 1152–1153. doi:10.1002/nadc.201290011. ISSN 1439-9598.
- Offermanns, Heribert (2009). "Der andere Ostwald". Nachrichten aus der Chemie (in German). 57 (12). Wiley: 1201–1202. doi:10.1002/nadc.200970167. ISSN 1439-9598.
- Keim, Wilhelm; Offermanns, Heribert (13 August 2007). "Friedrich Asinger (1907–1999): A Mediator between Basic and Applied Research". Angewandte Chemie International Edition. 46 (32). Wiley: 6010–6013. doi:10.1002/anie.200700904. ISSN 1433-7851. PMID 17563914.
- H. Offermanns: A plea for basic research - Utility is just a second-order moment, in: Chemie in unserer Zeit 2002, 36, 306–309.
- H. Offermanns: Wasserstoffperoxid - Verwendung in Umweltschutz und Synthese, in: Chemie in unserer Zeit 2000, 34, 150–159.
- Martens, Jürgen; Offermanns, Heribert; Scherberich, Paul (1981). "Einfache Synthese von racemischem Cystein". Angewandte Chemie (in German). 93 (8). Wiley: 680–683. Bibcode:1981AngCh..93..680M. doi:10.1002/ange.19810930808. ISSN 0044-8249.
- Weigert, Wolfgang M.; Offermanns, Heribert; Degussa, Paul Scherberich (1975). "D-Penicillamine?Production and Properties". Angewandte Chemie International Edition in English. 14 (5). Wiley: 330–336. doi:10.1002/anie.197503301. ISSN 0570-0833. PMID 808979.
- H. Offermanns, F. Asinger: Synthesen mit Ketonen, Schwefel und Ammoniak bzw. Aminen und chemisches Verhalten der Reaktionsprodukte, Westdeutscher Verlag, Köln und Opladen, 1966.
- Wolf, Mechthild (1998). Immer eine Idee besser : Forscher und Erfinder der Degussa (in German). Frankfurt am Main: Degussa AG. ISBN 3-00-002389-5. OCLC 48926783.
- Asinger, F.; Offermanns, H.; Neuray, D.; Müller, P. (1970). "Synthese von Thiomorpholin und 2-monoalkylierten Thiomorpholinen via 5,6-Dihydro-1,4-thiazine". Monatshefte für Chemie (in German). 101 (5). Springer Science and Business Media LLC: 1295–1308. doi:10.1007/bf00911395. ISSN 0026-9247. S2CID 91952256.
