= Trifluoromethylisocyanide =

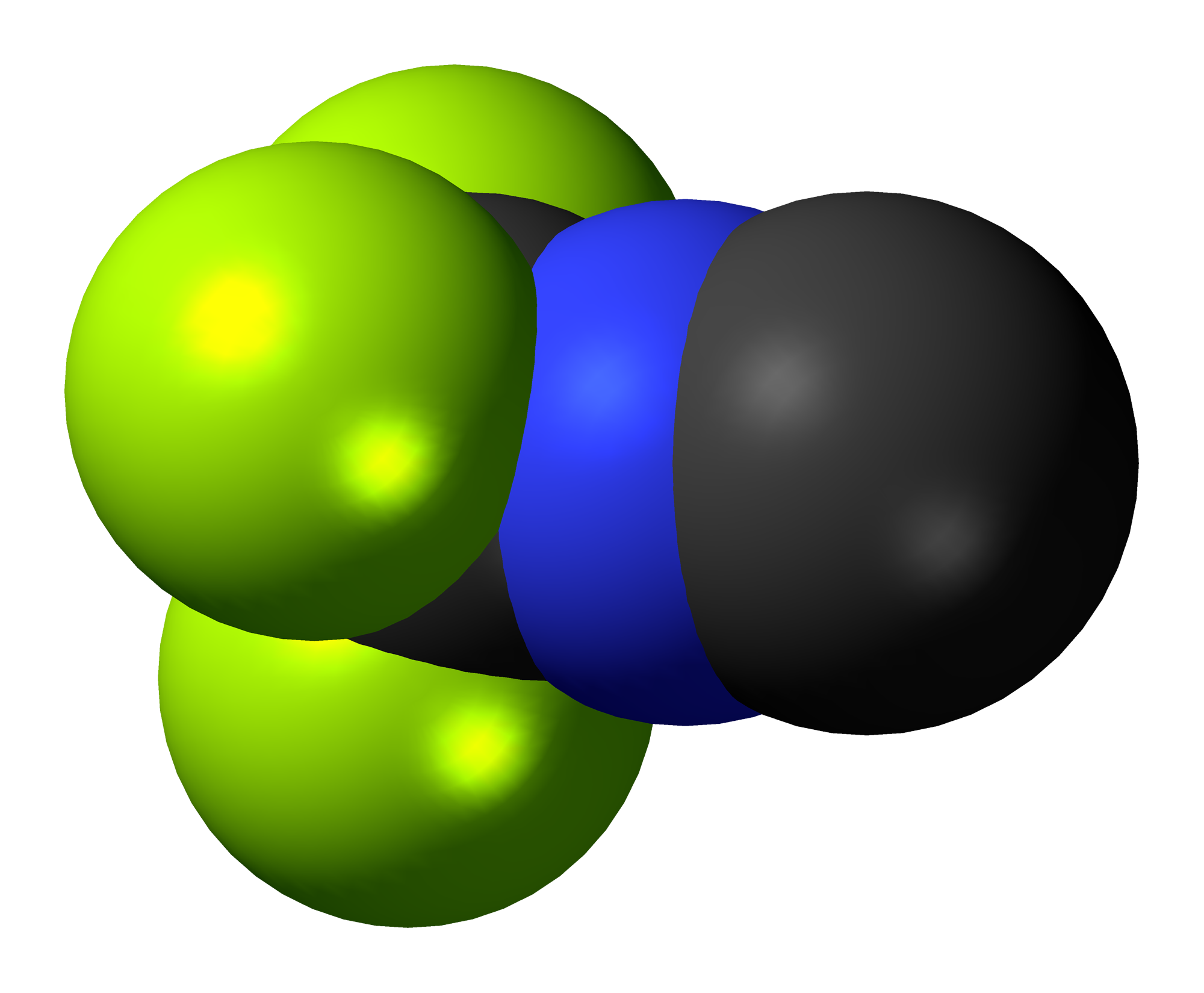

Names
- IUPAC name trifluoro(isocyano)methane
- Other names trifluoro-methyl-azaniumylidyne methane

Identifiers
CAS Number	19480-01-4
3D model (JSmol)	Interactive image
ChemSpider	128288
PubChem CID	145434
UNII	R3NG676YU8
CompTox Dashboard (EPA)	DTXSID10147379
- InChI: InChI=1S/C2F3N/c1-6-2(3,4)5 Key: LKHQVUSYAMWNQZ-UHFFFAOYSA-N; InChI=1/C2F3N/c1-6-2(3,4)5 Key: LKHQVUSYAMWNQZ-UHFFFAOYAU
- SMILES: [C-]#[N+]C(F)(F)F

Properties
Chemical formula	CF_{3}NC
Molar mass	95.023
- Except where otherwise noted, data are given for materials in their standard state (at 25 °C [77 °F], 100 kPa). verify (what is ?) Infobox references

Trifluoromethylisocyanide is the chemical compound with the formula CF_{3}NC. It is an isocyanide and a fluorocarbon. Polymerisation occurs even at temperatures below its boiling point of −80 °C. As a ligand in coordination chemistry, this species behaves similarly to carbon monoxide.

The compound trifluoracetonitrile (CF_{3}CN) is an isomer to trifluoromethylisocyanide. The nitrile is more stable, as is the usual case.
