= Phenylcarbylamine chloride =

Names
- IUPAC name Phenylcarbonimidoyl dichloride
- Other names Phenyl isocyanide dichloride, K-Stoff

Identifiers
CAS Number	622-44-6
3D model (JSmol)	Interactive image
ChemSpider	11646
ECHA InfoCard	100.009.760
EC Number	210-735-0
PubChem CID	12145
UNII	84XDL272K2
UN number	1672
CompTox Dashboard (EPA)	DTXSID6074833
- InChI: InChI=1S/C7H5Cl2N/c8-7(9)10-6-4-2-1-3-5-6/h1-5H Key: TTWWZVGVBRPHLE-UHFFFAOYSA-N
- SMILES: c1ccc(cc1)N=C(Cl)Cl

Properties
Chemical formula	C_{7}H_{5}Cl_{2}N
Molar mass	174.02 g·mol^{−1}
Appearance	Oily liquid
Odor	Onion-like
Melting point	19.5 °C (67.1 °F; 292.6 K)
Boiling point	210 °C (410 °F; 483 K) at 760 mmHg

Hazards
- Occupational safety and health (OHS/OSH)
Main hazards	Toxic
- GHS labelling
Pictograms	(GHS06: Toxic) (GHS07: Exclamation mark)
Signal word	Danger
Hazard statements	H302, H315, H319, H331, H335
Precautionary statements	P261, P264, P270, P271, P280, P301+P312, P302+P352, P304+P340, P305+P351+P338, P311, P312, P321, P330, P332+P313, P337+P313, P362, P403+P233, P405, P501
- Except where otherwise noted, data are given for materials in their standard state (at 25 °C [77 °F], 100 kPa). Infobox references

Phenylcarbylamine chloride is a chemical compound that was used as a chemical warfare agent. It is an oily liquid with an onion-like odor. Classified as an isocyanide dichloride, this compound is a lung irritant with lachrymatory effects.

== Synthesis ==
Phenylcarbylamine chloride is produced by chlorination of phenyl isothiocyanate.

== See also ==
- Chloropicrin
- Phosgene
