= Asinger reaction =

Chemical reaction

Named after	Friedrich Asinger
Reaction type	Ring forming reaction

Identifiers
RSC ontology ID	RXNO:0000688

The Asinger reaction (sometimes referred to as the Asinger-4 component reaction or A-4CR for short) is a multicomponent reaction for the synthesis of 3-thiazolines and other related heterocycles. It is named after Friedrich Asinger who first reported it in 1956.

Asinger-reaction using ketones

Asinger-reaction using aldehydes

== Process ==
An α-halogenated carbonyl-component reacts with sodium hydrosulfide (NaSH) and forms a thiol in situ. The thiol reacts directly with another carbonyl component and ammonia to form a thiazoline. The reaction works also by using elemental sulphur, an α–substituted ketone, another carbonyl component and ammonia; in this case, a mixture of products is formed.

The formation of 3-thiazolines also occurs by using α-thioaldehyde or α-thioketone and ammonia.

A simplified route of the Asinger-reaction was developed at Degussa. An α-halogenated carbonyl compound reacts with sodium hydrosulfide (NaSH) and forms a thiol in situ which reacts directly with aldehydes or ketones and ammonia to 3-thiazolines. The chemical industry developed based on the Asinger-reaction multi stage processes for the production of pharmaceuticals like D-penicillamine and the aminoacid DL-cysteine.

Synthesis of penicillamine by the Asinger reaction

== Literature ==
- Friedrich Asinger (1956). "Chemiker-Treffen Salzburg: Über die einfache und ergiebige Synthese von Thiazolonen". Angewandte Chemie. 68 (11): 377. doi:10.1002/ange.19560681109.
- Friedrich Asinger (1956). "Über die gemeinsame Einwirkung von Schwefel und Ammoniak auf Ketone". Angewandte Chemie. 68 (12): 413. Bibcode:1956AngCh..68..413A. doi:10.1002/ange.19560681209.
- Imre Schlemminger; Hans-Hermann Janknecht; Wolfgang Maison; Wolfgang Saak; Jürgen Martens (2000). "Synthesis of the first enantiomerically pure 3-thiazolines via Asinger reaction". Tetrahedron Letters. 41 (38): 7289–7292. doi:10.1016/S0040-4039(00)01266-1.
