= Methyl isocyanide =

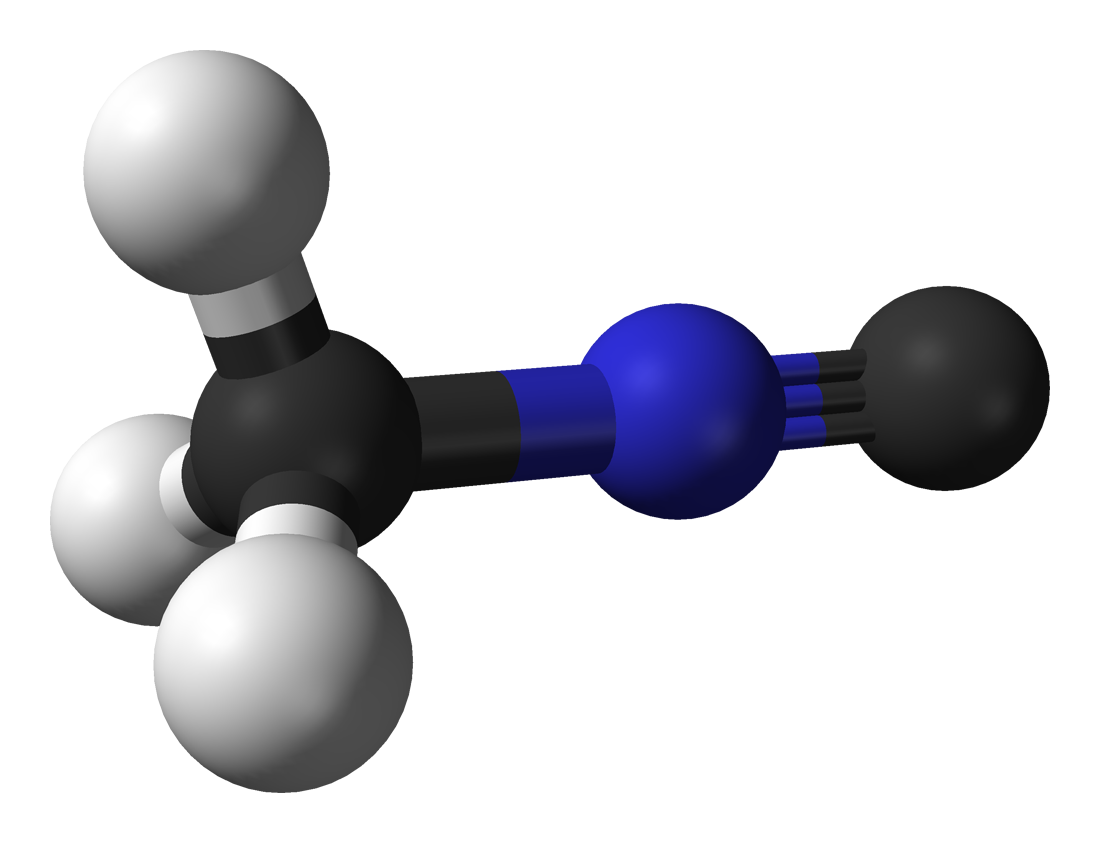

Names
- IUPAC name Isocyanomethane
- Other names: Methyl isocyanide; Isoacetonitrile; Methylisonitrile; Isomethanenitrile; Methaneisonitrile

Identifiers
CAS Number	593-75-9
3D model (JSmol)	Interactive image
ChEBI	CHEBI:44177
ChemSpider	11156
DrugBank	DB04337
ECHA InfoCard	100.008.917
EC Number	209-806-9
PubChem CID	11646
UNII	B5B6DXM7GG
CompTox Dashboard (EPA)	DTXSID3075040
- InChI: InChI=1S/C2H3N/c1-3-2/h1H3 Key: ZRKSVHFXTRFQFL-UHFFFAOYSA-N; InChI=1/C2H3N/c1-3-2/h1H3 Key: ZRKSVHFXTRFQFL-UHFFFAOYAI
- SMILES: [C-]#[N+]C

Properties
Chemical formula	C_{2}H_{3}N
Molar mass	41.053 g·mol^{−1}
Appearance	Colorless liquid
Density	0.69 g/mL
Melting point	−45 °C (−49 °F; 228 K)
Boiling point	59 to 60 °C (138 to 140 °F; 332 to 333 K)
Solubility in water	Miscible

Hazards
- GHS labelling
Pictograms	(GHS07: Exclamation mark) (GHS08: Health hazard)
Signal word	Warning
Hazard statements	H302, H312, H332, H373
Precautionary statements	P260, P264, P270, P271, P280, P301+P312, P302+P352, P304+P312, P304+P340, P312, P314, P322, P330, P363, P501
NFPA 704 (fire diamond)	2 3 0

Related compounds
Related compounds	acetic acid, acetamide, ethylamine, Acetonitrile
- Except where otherwise noted, data are given for materials in their standard state (at 25 °C [77 °F], 100 kPa). verify (what is ?) Infobox references

Methyl isocyanide or isocyanomethane is an organic compound and a member of the isocyanide family. This colorless liquid is isomeric and isoelectronic to methyl cyanide (acetonitrile), but its reactivity is very different. In contrast to the faintly sweet, ethereal odor of acetonitrile, the smell of methyl isocyanide, like that of other simple volatile isocyanides, is distinctly penetrating and vile. Methyl isocyanide is mainly used for making 5-membered heterocyclic rings. The C-N distance in methyl isocyanide is very short, 1.158 Å as is characteristic of isocyanides.

== Preparation and uses ==
Methyl isocyanide was first prepared by A. Gautier by reaction of silver cyanide with methyl iodide. The common method for preparing methyl isocyanides is the dehydration of N-methylformamide. Many metal cyanides react with methylating agents to give complexes of methyl isocyanide. This kind of reactivity has been invoked as being relevant to the origin of life.

Methyl isocyanide is useful for the preparation of diverse heterocycles. It is often used to prepare transition metal isocyanide complexes.

This compound has been found in the defensive secretions of certain marine sponges.

== Safety ==
Methyl isocyanide is very endothermic (Δ_{f}H^{⦵}(g) = +150.2 kJ/mol, 3.66 kJ/g) and can thus isomerize explosively to acetonitrile. A sample exploded when heated in a sealed ampoule, and during redistillation at 59 °C and 1 bar, a drop of liquid fell back into the dry boiler flask and exploded violently. The explosive properties of methyl isocyanide have been studied in detail.
