= Isocyanide dichloride =

An isocyanide dichloride.

Isocyanide dichlorides are organic compounds containing the RN=CCl_{2} functional group. Classically they are obtained by chlorination of isocyanides. Phenylcarbylamine chloride is a well-characterized example.

== Preparation ==
Chlorination of organic isothiocyanates is also well established:

RN=C=S + 2 Cl_{2} → RN=CCl_{2} + SCl_{2}

Alkylisocyanates are chlorinated by phosphorus pentachloride:

RN=C=O + PCl_{5} → RN=CCl_{2} + POCl_{3}

Cyanogen chloride also chlorinates to give the isocyanide dichloride:

ClCN + Cl_{2} → ClN=CCl_{2}

== Reactions ==
Isocyanide dichlorides participate in Friedel-Crafts-like reactions, leading, after hydrolysis, to benzamides:

RN=CCl_{2} + ArH → RN=C(Cl)Ar + HCl
RN=C(Cl)Ar + H_{2}O → R(H)NC(O)Ar + HCl

The N=C bond is relatively inert.

Hydrogen fluoride displaces the chlorides to give the isocyanide difluoride.
