= Trifluoroacetonitrile =

Identifiers
CAS Number	353-85-5
3D model (JSmol)	Interactive image
ChemSpider	61029
ECHA InfoCard	100.005.948
EC Number	206-542-6
PubChem CID	67710
CompTox Dashboard (EPA)	DTXSID1059862
- InChI: InChI=1S/C2F3N/c3-2(4,5)1-6 Key: SFFUEHODRAXXIA-UHFFFAOYSA-N
- SMILES: FC(F)(F)C#N

Properties
Chemical formula	C_{2}F_{3}N
Molar mass	95.024 g·mol^{−1}
Appearance	colourless gas
Boiling point	−64 °C (1013 hPa)
Solubility in water	insoluble

Related compounds
Related compounds	acetonitrile trifluoromethylisocyanide trichloroacetonitrile
- Except where otherwise noted, data are given for materials in their standard state (at 25 °C [77 °F], 100 kPa). Infobox references

Trifluoroacetonitrile is a nitrile with the chemical formula CF_{3}CN.

== Production ==
Trifluoroacetonitrile can be produced by dehydration of trifluoroacetamide with trifluoroacetic anhydride in pyridine or carbon tetrachloride. This synthesis route was first described by Frédéric Swarts in 1922.

Trifluoroacetonitrile can also be produced by reacting 1,1,1-trichloro-2,2,2-trifluoroethane and ammonia at 610 °C.

== Properties ==
Trifluoroacetonitrile is a colourless gas that is insoluble in water. Solid trifluoroacetonitrile's crystal structure is orthorhombic.

== Uses ==
Trifluoroacetonitrile can be used to prepare other chemicals such as 3-(trifluoromethyl)isoquinoline and 2,4-bis(trifluoromethyl)pyrimidine.
