= Passerini reaction =

Chemical reaction

Named after	Mario Passerini
Reaction type	Carbon-carbon bond forming reaction

Identifiers
Organic Chemistry Portal	passerini-reaction
RSC ontology ID	RXNO:0000244

The Passerini reaction is a chemical reaction involving an isocyanide, an aldehyde (or ketone), and a carboxylic acid to form a α-acyloxy amide. This addition reaction is one of the oldest isocyanide-based multicomponent reactions and was first described in 1921 by Mario Passerini in Florence, Italy. It is typically carried out in aprotic solvents but can alternatively be performed in water, ionic liquids, or deep eutectic solvents. It is a third order reaction; first order in each of the reactants. The Passerini reaction is often used in combinatorial and medicinal chemistry with recent utility in green chemistry and polymer chemistry. As isocyanides exhibit high functional group tolerance, chemoselectivity, regioselectivity, and stereoselectivity, the Passerini reaction has a wide range of synthetic applications.

The Passerini reaction

== Mechanism ==
The Passerini reaction has been hypothesized to occur through two mechanistic pathways. The reaction pathways are dependent on the solvent used.

=== Concerted mechanism ===
A concerted mechanism, seen in S_{N}2 and Diels−Alder reactions, is theorized to occur when the Passerini reagents are present at high concentration in aprotic solvents.

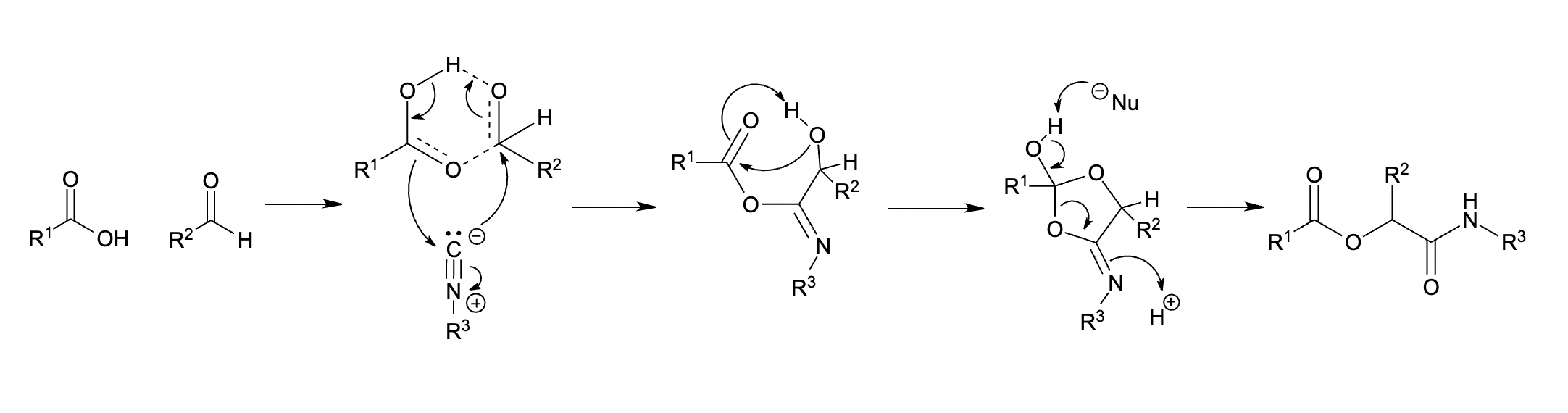
Proposed concerted version of the Passerini reaction mechanism.

This mechanism involves a trimolecular reaction between the isocyanide, carboxylic acid, and carbonyl in a sequence of nucleophilic additions. The reaction proceeds first through an imidate intermediate and then undergoes Mumm rearrangement to afford the Passerini product.

As the Mumm rearrangement requires a second carboxylic acid molecule, this mechanism classifies the Passerini reaction as an organocatalytic reaction.

=== Ionic mechanism ===
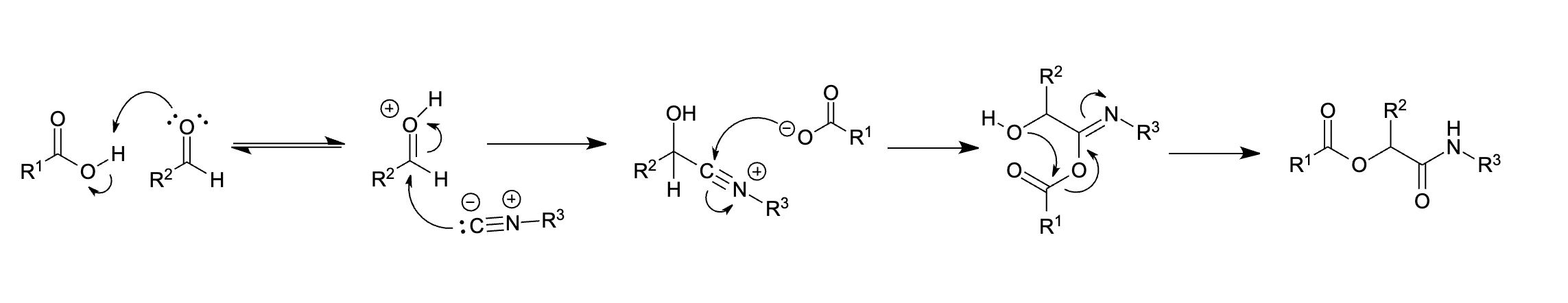
Proposed ionic version of the Passerini reaction mechanism.

In polar solvents, such as methanol or water, the carbonyl is protonated before nucleophilic addition of the isocyanide, affording a nitrilium ion intermediate. This is followed by the addition of a carboxylate, acyl group transfer and proton transfer respectively to give the desired Passerini product.

== Reaction control ==
Molecular weights of polymers synthesized through the Passerini can be controlled through stoichiometric means. For example, polymer chain length and weight can adjusted through isocyanide stoichiometry, and polymer geometry can be influenced through starting reagents. To facilitate the Passerini reaction between bulky, sterically hindered reagents, a vortex fluidic device can be used to induce high shear conditions. These conditions emulate the effects of high temperature and pressure, allowing the Passerini reaction to proceed fairly quickly. The Passerini reaction can also exhibit enantioselectivity. Addition of tert-butyl isocyanide to a wide variety of aldehydes (aromatic, heteroaromatic, olefinic, acetylenic, aliphatic) is achieved using a catalytic system of tetrachloride and a chiral bisphosphoramide which provides good yield and good enantioselectivities. For other types of isocyanides, rate of addition of isocyanide to reaction mixture dictates good yields and high selectivities.

== Applications ==
Apart from forming α-acyloxy amide products, the Passerini reaction can be used to form heterocycles, polymers, amino acids, and medicinal products.

=== Heterocycles ===
Isocoumarin structure, a heterocycle afforded by a post-Passerini cyclization reaction.

The original Passerini reaction produces acyclic depsipeptides which are labile in physiological conditions. To increase product stability for medicinal use, post-Passerini cyclization reactions have been used to afford heterocycles such as β-lactams, butenolides, and isocoumarins. To enable these cyclizations, reagents are pre-functionalized with reactive groups (ex. halogens, azides, etc.) and used in tandem with other reactions (ex. Passerini-Knoevenagel, Passerini-Dieckmann) to afford heterocyclic products. Compounds like three membered oxirane and aziridine derivatives, four-membered b-lactams, and five-membered tetrasubstituted 4,5-dihydropyrazoles have been produced through this reaction.

=== Polymers ===
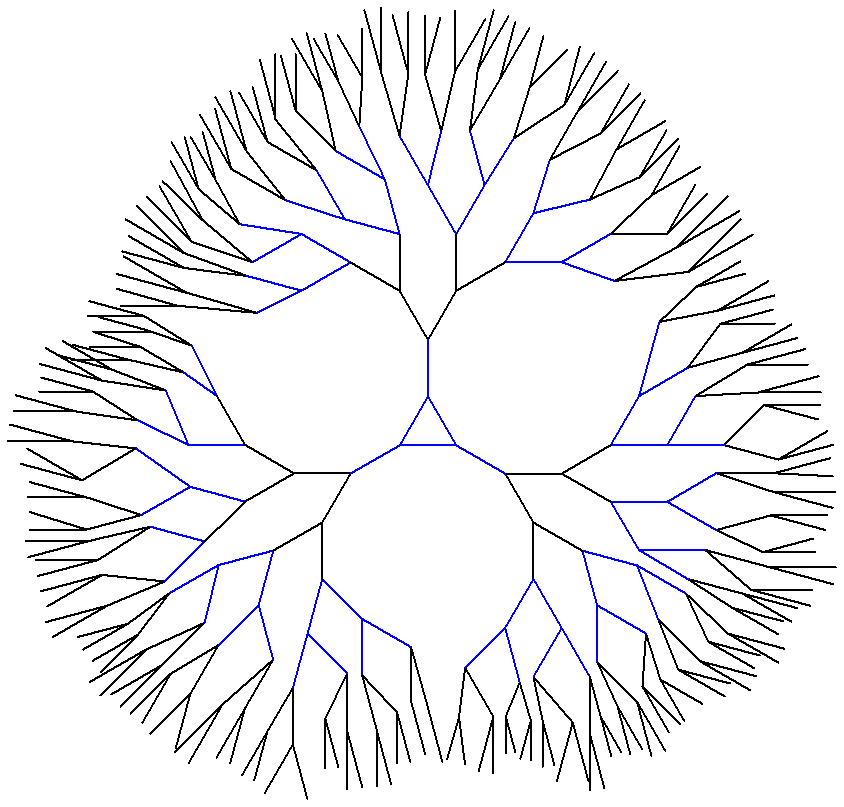
Dendrimer general structure, a type of polymer that the Passerini reaction forms.

This reaction has also been used for polymerization, monomer formation, and post-polymerization modification. The Passerini reaction has also been used to form sequence-defined polymers. Bifunctional substrates can be used to undergo post-polymerization modification or serve as precursors for polymerization. As this reaction has high functional group tolerance, the polymers created using this reaction are widely diverse with tuneable properties. Macromolecules that have been produced with this reaction include macroamides, macrocyclic depsipeptides, three-component dendrimers and three-armed star branched mesogen core molecules.

=== Amino acids and pharmaceuticals ===
Passerini reaction has been employed for the formation of structures like α-amino acids, α-hydroxy-β-amino acids, α-ketoamides, β-ketoamides, α-hydroxyketones and α-aminoxyamides. The Passerini reaction has synthesized α-Acyloxy carboxamides that have demonstrated activity as anti-cancer medications along with functionalized [C60]-fullerenes used in medicinal and plant chemistry. This reaction has also been used as a synthetic step in the total synthesis of commercially available pharmaceuticals such as telaprevir (VX-950), an antiviral sold by Vertex Pharmaceuticals and Johnson & Johnson.

The antiviral drug telaprevir, the Passerini reaction is used in its synthesis.

== See also ==
- Ugi reaction
