= Asoxime chloride =

Chemical compound

Clinical data
- Routes of administration: Intramuscular injection
- ATC code: none

Legal status
- Legal status: Experimental

Identifiers
- IUPAC name: 4-carbamoyl-1-[({2-[(E)-(hydroxyimino)methyl]pyridinium-1-yl}methoxy)methyl]pyridinium dichloride
- CAS Number: 34433-31-3
- PubChem CID: 5484128
- ChemSpider: 13004322
- UNII: HUV88P6SJS
- ChEMBL: ChEMBL33051
- CompTox Dashboard (EPA): DTXSID101029616

Chemical and physical data
- Formula: C_{14}H_{16}Cl_{2}N_{4}O_{3}
- Molar mass: 359.21 g·mol^{−1}
- 3D model (JSmol): Interactive image
- SMILES: C1=CC=[N+](C(=C1)/C=N/O)COC[N+]2=CC=C(C=C2)C(=O)N.[Cl-].[Cl-]
- InChI: InChI=1S/C14H14N4O3.2ClH/c15-14(19)12-4-7-17(8-5-12)10-21-11-18-6-2-1-3-13(18)9-16-20;;/h1-9H,10-11H2,(H-,15,19);2*1H; Key:QELSIJXWEROXOE-UHFFFAOYSA-N

Asoxime chloride, or more commonly HI-6, is a Hagedorn oxime used in the treatment of organophosphate poisoning.

== Discovery ==
HI-6 was developed in the 1968 in Ilse Hagedorn's lab at the University of Freiburg in then West Germany as a potent antidote for poisoning by organophosphorus nerve agents. The compound was created in response to limitations of earlier oxime antidotes, which were effective against some nerve agents but failed to protect against others such as soman.

== Structure ==
Much like pralidoxime, asoxime and other oximes created in the Hagedorn lab (i.e. LüH-6, HLö-7) are pyridine oximes, sharing the same structural feature of a byspyridinium nucleus. Position 2 and 4 on one of the pyridine rings is essential for pharmacological activity, as is position 4 on the second ring for both efficacy and toxic effects alike. Amidation on the second ring at position 4 is essential for reducing toxicity of the derivative compounds.

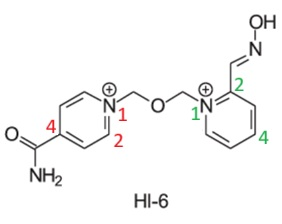
Position of key groups in Hagedorn Oxime HI-6 (Positions 2 and 4 with respect to the pyridine ring derive most potency, while the amide group in Position two (red) decreases toxicity of HI-6

== See also ==
- Obidoxime
- Pralidoxime
