= Mumm rearrangement =

Named after	Otto Mumm
Reaction type	Rearrangement reaction

Identifiers
RSC ontology ID	RXNO:0000513

The Mumm rearrangement is an organic reaction and a rearrangement reaction. It describes a 1,3(O-N) acyl transfer of an acyl imidate or isoimide group to an imide.

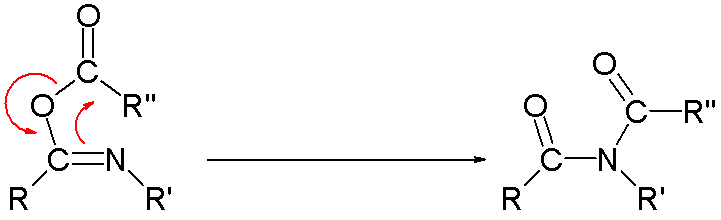
The Mumm rearrangement

The reaction is of relevance as part of the Ugi reaction.
