= Ugi reaction =

Multi-component named reaction in organic chemistry

Named after	Ivar Karl Ugi
Reaction type	Coupling reaction

Identifiers
Organic Chemistry Portal	ugi-reaction
RSC ontology ID	RXNO:0000129

In organic chemistry, the Ugi reaction is a multi-component reaction involving a ketone or aldehyde, an amine, an isocyanide and a carboxylic acid to form a bis-amide. The reaction is named after Ivar Karl Ugi, who first reported this reaction in 1959.

The Ugi reaction

The Ugi reaction is exothermic and usually complete within minutes of adding the isocyanide. High concentration (0.5M - 2.0M) of reactants give the highest yields. Polar, aprotic solvents, like DMF, work well. However, methanol and ethanol have also been used successfully. This uncatalyzed reaction has an inherent high atom economy as only a molecule of water is lost, and the chemical yield in general is high. Several reviews have been published.

Due to the reaction products being potential protein mimetics there have been many attempts to development an enantioselective Ugi reaction, the first successful report of which was in 2018.

== Reaction mechanism ==
One plausible reaction mechanism is depicted below:

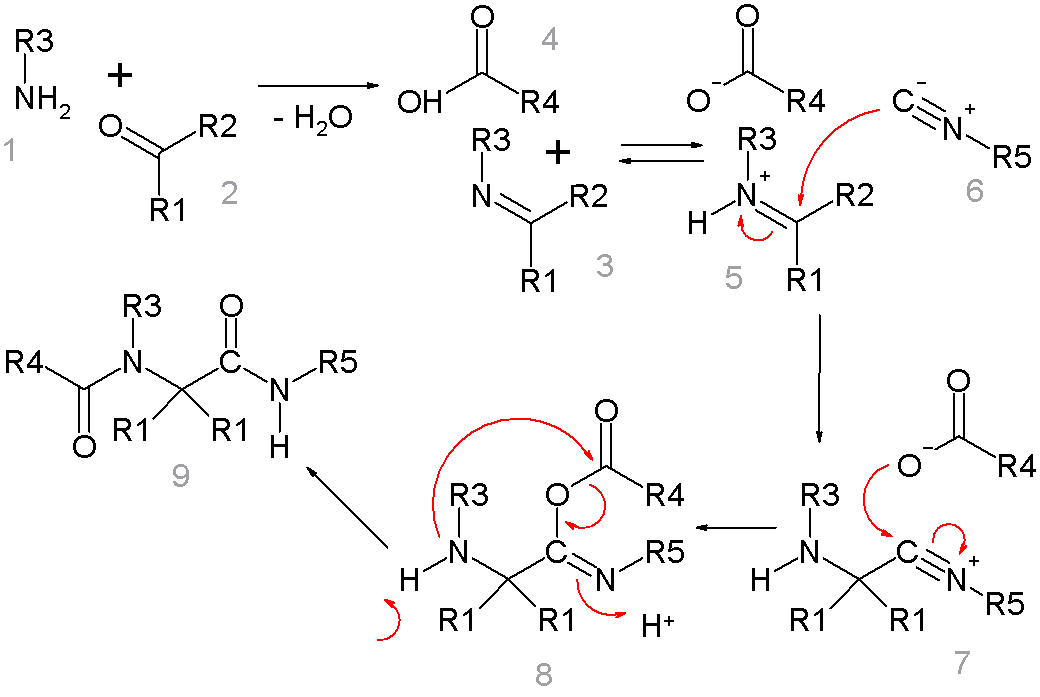
Detailed Ugi mechanism

Amine 1 and ketone 2 form the imine 3 with loss of one equivalent of water. Proton exchange with carboxylic acid 4 activates the iminium ion 5 for nucleophilic addition of the isocyanide 6 with its terminal carbon atom to nitrilium ion 7. A second nucleophilic addition takes place at this intermediate with the carboxylic acid anion to 8. The final step is a Mumm rearrangement with transfer of the R4 acyl group from oxygen to nitrogen. All reaction steps are reversible except for the Mumm rearrangement, which drives the whole reaction sequence.

In the related Passerini reaction (lacking the amine), the isocyanide reacts directly with the carbonyl group, but other aspects of the reaction are the same. This reaction can take place concurrently with the Ugi reaction, acting as a source of impurities.

== Variations ==
=== Combination of reaction components ===
The usage of bifunctional reaction components greatly increases the diversity of possible reaction products. Likewise, several combinations lead to structurally interesting products. The Ugi reaction has been applied in combination with an intramolecular Diels-Alder reaction in an extended multistep reaction.

A reaction in its own right is the Ugi–Smiles reaction with the carboxylic acid component replaced by a phenol. In this reaction the Mumm rearrangement in the final step is replaced by the Smiles rearrangement.

Ugi–Diels–Alder reaction	Ugi–Smiles reaction
Ugi–Diels–Alder reaction	Ugi–Smiles reaction

Another combination (with separate workup of the Ugi intermediate) is one with the Buchwald–Hartwig reaction. In the Ugi–Heck reaction a Heck aryl-aryl coupling takes place in a second step.

Ugi Buchwald–Hartwig reaction	Ugi≠Heck reaction
Ugi–Buchwald–Hartwig reaction	Ugi–Heck reaction

==== Combination of amine and carboxylic acid ====
Several groups have used β-amino acids in the Ugi reaction to prepare β-lactams. This approach relies on acyl transfer in the Mumm rearrangement to form the four-membered ring. The reaction proceeds in moderate yield at room temperature in methanol with formaldehyde or a variety of aryl aldehydes. For example, p-nitrobenzaldehyde reacts to form the β-lactam shown in 71% yield as a 4:1 diastereomeric mixture:

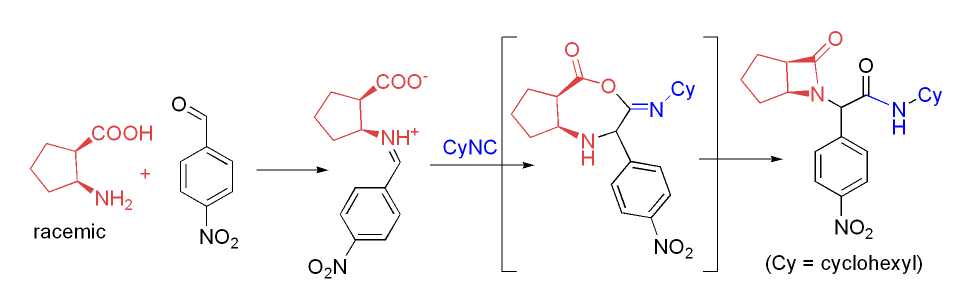
An example of the use of the Ugi reaction to form a beta-lactam

==== Combination of carbonyl compound and carboxylic acid ====
Zhang et al. have combined aldehydes with carboxylic acids and used the Ugi reaction to create lactams of various sizes. Short et al. have prepared γ-lactams from keto-acids on solid-support.

== Applications ==
=== Chemical libraries ===
The Ugi reaction is one of the first reactions to be exploited explicitly to develop chemical libraries. These chemical libraries are sets of compounds that can be tested repeatedly. Using the principles of combinatorial chemistry, the Ugi reaction offers the possibility to synthesize a great number of compounds in one reaction, by the reaction of various ketones (or aldehydes), amines, isocyanides and carboxylic acids. These libraries can then be tested with enzymes or living organisms to find new active pharmaceutical substances. One drawback is the lack of chemical diversity of the products. Using the Ugi reaction in combination with other reactions enlarges the chemical diversity of possible products.

Examples of Ugi reaction combinations:

- Isoquinolines from Ugi and Heck reactions.

=== Pharmaceutical industry ===
Crixivan can be prepared using the Ugi reaction.

Additionally, many of the caine-type anesthetics are synthesized using this reaction. Examples include lidocaine and bupivacaine.

== See also ==
- Passerini reaction
