= Isocyanide =

Chemical compound with the group –N+≡C–

$\left[\ce{R}-\overset{\oplus}\ce{N}\ce{#}\overset{\ominus}\ce{C}\ce{:\, <-> R-\ddot{N}=C{:}}\right]$
General resonance structure of an isocyanide

An isocyanide (also called isonitrile or carbylamine) is an organic compound with the functional group –N^{+}≡C^{−}. It is the isomer of the related nitrile (–C≡N), hence the prefix is isocyano. The organic fragment is connected to the isocyanide group through the nitrogen atom, not via the carbon. They are used as building blocks for the synthesis of other compounds.

== Properties ==
=== Structure and bonding ===
The C-N distance in isocyanides is 115.8 pm in methyl isocyanide. The C-N-C angles are near 180°.

Akin to carbon monoxide, isocyanides are described by two resonance structures, one with a triple bond between the nitrogen and the carbon and one with a double bond between them. The π lone pair of the nitrogen stabilizes the structure and is responsible of the linearity of isocyanides, although the reactivity of isocyanides reflects some carbene character, at least in a formal sense. Thus, both resonance structures are useful representations. They are susceptible to polymerization.

=== Spectroscopy ===
Isocyanides exhibit a strong absorption in their IR spectra in the range of 2165–2110 cm^{−1}.

The electronic symmetry about the isocyanide ^{14}N nucleus results in a slow quadrupolar relaxation so that ^{13}C-^{14}N nuclear spin coupling can be observed, with coupling constants of ca. 5 Hz for the isocyanide ^{13}C nucleus and 5–14 Hz for the ^{13}C nucleus which the isocyanide group is attached to.

=== Odour ===
Volatile isocyanides frequently have very disagreeable odours. Lieke remarked that "Es besitzt einen penetranten, höchst unangenehmen Geruch; das Oeffnen eines Gefässes mit Cyanallyl [sic] reicht hin, die Luft eines Zimmers mehrere Tage lang zu verpesten [It has a penetrating, extremely unpleasant odour; the opening of a flask of allyl cyanide [sic] is enough to foul up the air in a room for several days]...." Note that in Lieke's day, the difference between isocyanide and nitrile was not fully appreciated.

Ivar Karl Ugi states that "The development of the chemistry of isocyanides has probably suffered only little delay through the characteristic odor of volatile isonitriles, which has been described by Hofmann and Gautier as 'highly specific, almost overpowering', 'horrible', and 'extremely distressing'. It is true that many potential workers in this field have been turned away by the odour, but this is heavily outweighed by the fact that isonitriles can be detected even in traces, and that most of the routes leading to the formation of isonitriles were discovered through the odor of these compounds." Isocyanides have been investigated as potential non-lethal weapons.

Some isocyanides convey less offensive odours such as malt, natural rubber, creosote, cherry or old wood. Non-volatile derivatives such as tosylmethyl isocyanide do not have an odor.

=== Toxicity ===
While some isocyanides (e.g., cyclohexyl isocyanide) are toxic, others "exhibit no appreciable toxicity for mammals". Referring to ethyl isocyanide, toxicological studies in the 1960s at Bayer showed that "oral and subcutaneous doses of 500-5000 mg/kg can be tolerated by mice".

== Synthesis ==
Many routes to isocyanides have been developed.

=== From formamides ===
Commonly, isocyanides are synthesized by dehydration of formamides. The formamide can be dehydrated with toluenesulfonyl chloride, phosphorus oxychloride, phosgene, diphosgene, or the Burgess reagent in the presence of a base such as pyridine or triethylamine. Modern synthesis also employ the use of triphenylphosphine with iodine.

RNHC(=O)H + ArSO_{2}Cl + 2 C_{5}H_{5}N → RNC + [C_{5}H_{5}NH]^{+}[ArSO_{3}]^{−} + [C_{5}H_{5}NH]^{+}Cl^{−}

The formamide precursors are, in turn, prepared from amines by formylation with formic acid or formyl acetyl anhydride, or from the Ritter reaction of alkenes (and other sources of carbocations) and hydrogen cyanide.

=== From dichlorocarbene ===
In the carbylamine reaction (also known as the Hofmann isocyanide synthesis) alkali base reacts with chloroform to produce dichlorocarbene. The carbene then converts primary amines to isocyanides. Illustrative is the synthesis of tert-butyl isocyanide from tert-butylamine in the presence of catalytic amount of the phase transfer catalyst benzyltriethylammonium chloride.

Me_{3}CNH_{2} + CHCl_{3} + 3 NaOH → Me_{3}CNC + 3 NaCl + 3 H_{2}O

As it is only effective for primary amines, this reaction can be used as a chemical test for their presence.

=== Silver cyanide route ===
Of historical interest but not often of practical value, the first isocyanide, allyl isocyanide, was prepared by the reaction of allyl iodide and silver cyanide.

RI + AgCN → RNC + AgI

=== Other methods ===
Another route to isocyanides entails deprotonation of oxazoles and benzoxazoles in the 2-position. The resulting organolithium compound exists in chemical equilibrium with the 2-isocyanophenolate, which can be captured by an electrophile such as an acid chloride.

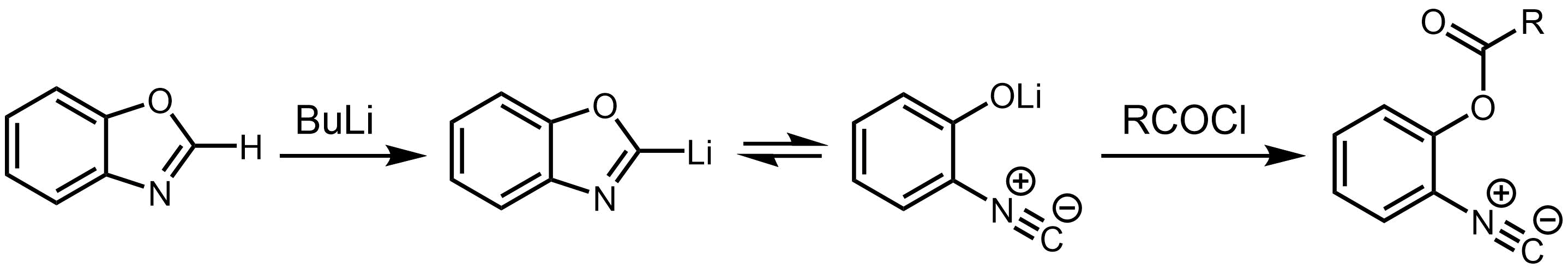

In some cases, a phosphonite ester-amide can desulfurize isothiocyanates to isocyanides. Likewise triphenylphosphine reduces isocyanide dichlorides to isocyanides.

== Reactions ==
Isocyanides have diverse reactivity.

Isocyanides are stable to strong base (they are often made under strongly basic conditions), but they are sensitive to acid. In the presence of aqueous acid, isocyanides hydrolyse to the corresponding formamides:

RNC + H_{2}O → RNHC(=O)H

This reaction is used to destroy odorous isocyanide mixtures. Some isocyanides can polymerize in the presence of Lewis and Bronsted acids.

Isocyanides participate in many multicomponent reactions of interest in organic synthesis, two of which are: the Ugi reaction and the Passerini reaction.

Isocyanides also participate in cycloaddition reactions, such as the [4+1] cycloaddition with tetrazines. Depending on the degree of substitution of the isocyanide, this reaction converts isocyanides into carbonyls or gives stable cycloadducts.

They also undergo insertion into the C–Cl bonds of acyl chlorides in the Nef isocyanide reaction, a process that is believed to be concerted and illustrates their carbene character.

Chlorination of isocyanides gives isocyanide dichlorides. This is traditionally done using chlorine gas, though newer methods have shown thionyl chloride and iodobenzene dichloride as capable chlorinating agents for this reaction. Analogous reactions occur with bromine and iodine. Likewise, isocyanides reacts with selenium metal at elevated temperatures (~60 °C) to give isoselenocyanates.

Much like nitriles, isocyanides are electron-withdrawing and easily deprotonate at the α position. For example, benzyl isocyanide has a pK_{a} in DMSO of 27.4 and benzyl cyanide has a pK_{a} of 21.9, but toluene has a pK_{a} in the 40s. In the gas phase, CH_{3}NC is 1.8 kcal/mol less acidic than CH_{3}CN.

=== Ligands in coordination chemistry ===
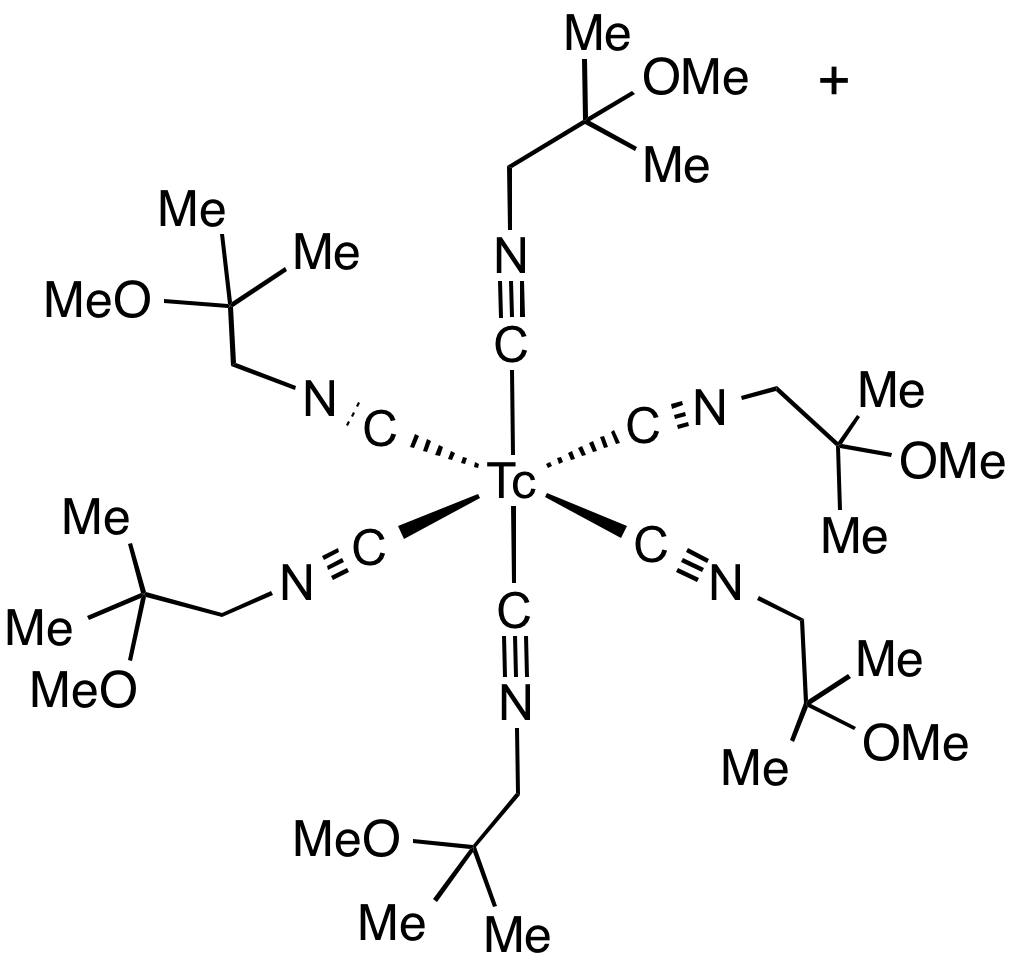
Technetium sestamibi is a commercial isocyanide complex that is used in medicine for imaging.

Isocyanides form coordination complexes with most transition metals. They behave as electron-rich analogues of carbon monoxide. For example tert-butyl isocyanide forms Fe_{2}(tBuNC)_{9}, which is analogous to Fe_{2}(CO)_{9}. Although structurally similar, the analogous carbonyls differ in several ways, mainly because t-BuNC is a better donor ligand than CO. Thus, Fe(tBuNC)_{5} is easily protonated, whereas its counterpart Fe(CO)_{5} is not.

Isocyanides have also been shown to be a useful reagent in palladium catalysed reactions with a wide variety of compounds being formed using this method.

== Naturally occurring isocyanides ==
Only few naturally occurring compounds exhibit the isocyanide functionality. The first was discovered in 1957 in an extract of the mold Penicillium notatum. The compound xanthocillin later was used as an antibiotic. Since then numerous other isocyanides have been isolated. Most of the marine isocyanides are terpenoid, while some of the terrestrial isocyanides originate from α-aminoacids.

Xanthocillin is a rare natural product that contains two isocyanide groups.

== Nomenclature ==
IUPAC uses the prefix "isocyano" for the systematic nomenclature of isocyanides: isocyanomethane, isocyanoethane, isocyanopropane, etc.

The sometimes used old term "carbylamine" conflicts with systematic nomenclature. An amine always has three single bonds, whereas an isocyanide has only one single and one multiple bond.

The isocyanamide functional group consists of an amino group attached to an isocyano moiety. The isonitrile suffix or isocyano- prefix is used depending upon priority table.
