= Xantocillin =

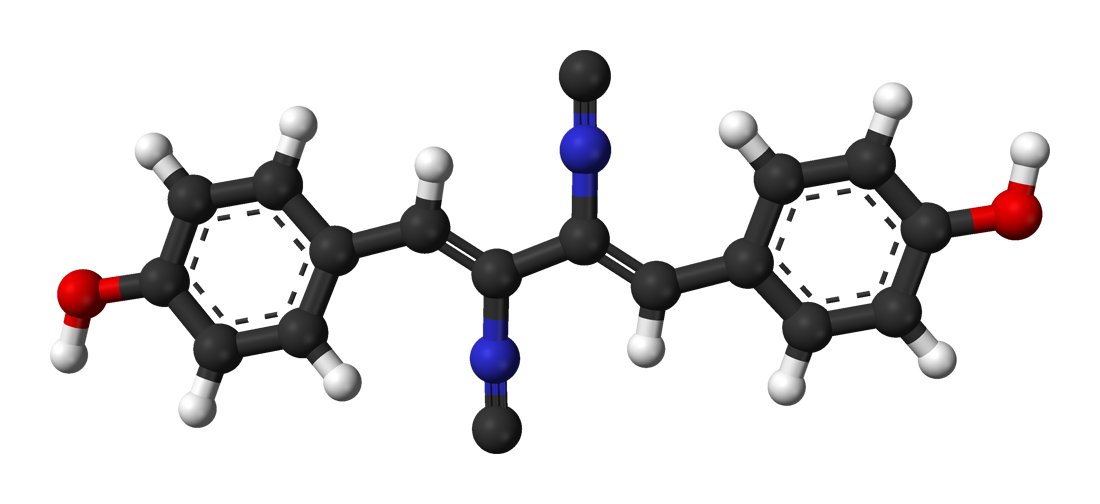

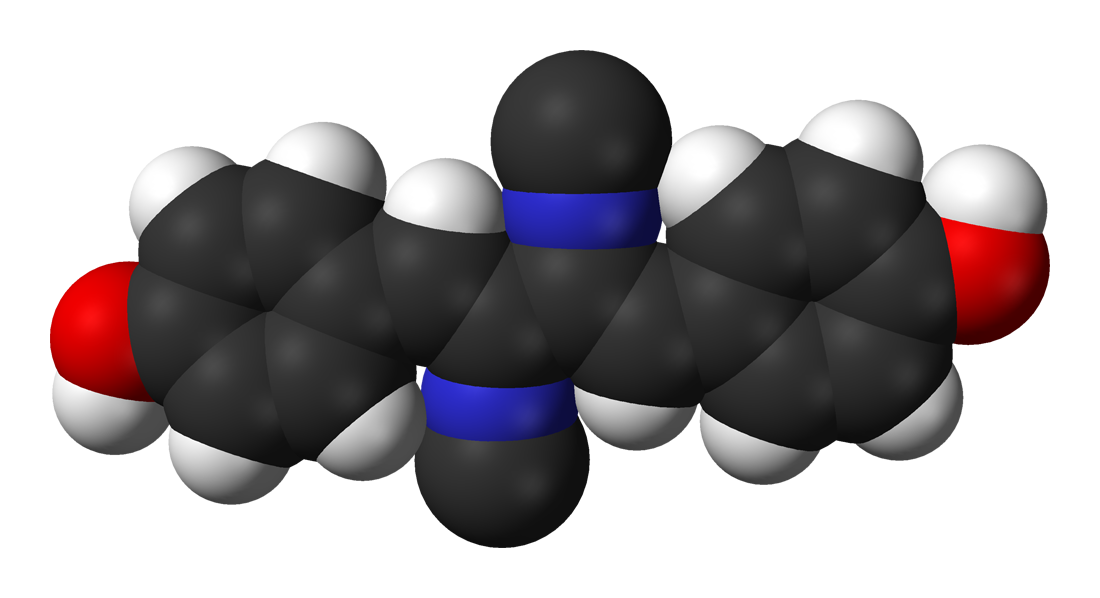

Names
- Preferred IUPAC name 4,4′-[(1Z,3Z)-2,3-Diisocyanobuta-1,3-diene-1,4-diyl]diphenol
- Other names Xanthocillin X, Ophthocillin

Identifiers
CAS Number	580-74-5
3D model (JSmol)	Interactive image
ChEMBL	ChEMBL1977264
ChemSpider	21106491
EC Number	234-271-3
PubChem CID	5378293
UNII	06Z55VZ40D
CompTox Dashboard (EPA)	DTXSID801018149
- InChI: InChI=1S/C18H12N2O2/c1-19-17(11-13-3-7-15(21)8-4-13)18(20-2)12-14-5-9-16(22)10-6-14/h3-12,21-22H/b17-11-,18-12- Key: YBMVKDUTYAGKEW-WHYMJUELSA-N
- SMILES: [C-]#[N+]C(=CC1=CC=C(C=C1)O)C(=CC2=CC=C(C=C2)O)[N+]#[C-]

Properties
Chemical formula	C_{18}H_{12}N_{2}O_{2}
Molar mass	288.306 g·mol^{−1}
Appearance	Yellow crystals
Melting point	200 °C (392 °F; 473 K) (decomposes)
- Except where otherwise noted, data are given for materials in their standard state (at 25 °C [77 °F], 100 kPa). Infobox references

Xantocillin (INN), also known as xanthocillin X or ophthocillin, was the first reported natural product found to contain the isocyanide functional group. It was first isolated from Penicillium notatum by Rothe in 1950 and subsequently from several other sources. It possesses antibiotic properties.
