= Multi-component reaction =

A multi-component reaction (MCR), sometimes referred to as a multi-component assembly process (MCAP), is a chemical reaction where three or more compounds react to form a single product. By definition, multicomponent reactions are those reactions whereby more than two reactants combine in a sequential manner to give highly selective products that retain majority of the atoms of the starting material.

== History and types of multicomponent reactions ==
Multicomponent reactions have been known for over 150 years. The first documented multicomponent reaction was the Strecker synthesis of α-amino cyanides in 1850 from which α-amino acids could be derived. A multitude of MCRs exist today, of which the isocyanide based MCRs are the most documented. Other MCRs include free-radical mediated MCRs, MCRs based on organoboron compounds and metal-catalyzed MCRs.

Isocyanide based MCRs are most frequently exploited because the isocyanide is an extraordinary functional group. It is believed to exhibit resonance between its tetravalent and divalent carbon forms. This induces the isocyanide group to undergo both electrophilic and nucleophilic reactions at the CII atom, which then converts to the CIV form in an exothermic reaction. The occurrence of isocyanides in natural products has also made it a useful functional group. The two most important isocyanide-based multicomponent reactions are the Passerini three-component reaction to produce α-acyloxy carboxamides and the Ugi four-component reaction, which yields the α-amino carboxamides.

Examples of three component reactions:

- Alkyne trimerisation
- Biginelli reaction
- Bucherer–Bergs reaction
- Gewald reaction
- Grieco three-component coupling
- Hantzsch pyridine synthesis
- Kabachnik–Fields reaction
- Mannich reaction
- Passerini reaction
- Pauson–Khand reaction
- Petasis reaction
- Strecker amino acid synthesis
- Ugi reaction
- Asinger reaction
- A3 coupling reaction

The exact nature of this type of reaction is often difficult to assess, in collision theory a simultaneous interaction of three or more different molecules is less likely resulting in a low reaction rate. These reactions are more likely to involve a series of bimolecular reactions.

New MCR's are found by building a chemical library from combinatorial chemistry or by combining existing MCR's. For example, a 7-component MCR results from combining the Ugi reaction with the Asinger reaction. MCR's are an important tool in new drug discovery. MCR's can often be extended into combinatorial, solid phase or flow syntheses for developing new lead structures of active agents.

== See also ==
- A tandem reaction is a consecutive series of intramolecular organic reactions.
